

U

 The U (2009)
 U, Bomsi n Me (2005)
 U, Me Aur Ghar (2017)
 The U Movie (2010)
 U pěti veverek (1944)
 U pokladny stál... (1939)
 U raskoraku (1968)
 U sredini mojih dana (1988)
 U2 3D (2008)
 U2 Live at Red Rocks: Under a Blood Red Sky (1983)
 U2360° at the Rose Bowl (2010)
 U-571 (2000)
 U-9 Weddigen (1927)
 U-Boat Prisoner (1944)
 U-Boote westwärts! (1941)
 U-Carmen eKhayelitsha (2005)
 UFO: (1956, 2018 & 2022)
 UFO Abduction (1989)
 The UFO Incident (1975 TV)
 UFO Robot Grendizer vs. Great Mazinger (1976)
 UFO: Target Earth (1974)
 U.F.O. (1993, 2013)
 UFOs: Past, Present, and Future (1974)
 UFOs: Seeing Is Believing (2005)
 UFOria (1985)
 UHF (1989)
 U.N. Me (2009) 
 U.N.R.R.A. presents In the Wake of the Armies ... (1941)
 The U.P. Trail (1920)
 U.S. Marshals (1998)
 U.S. Seals II: The Ultimate Force (2001)
 The U.S. vs. John Lennon (2006)
 USS Cooper: Return to Ormoc Bay (2005)
 USS Indianapolis: Men of Courage (2016)
 U Turn (1997)
 U-Turn (1973)

Ub–Ud

 Ubalda, All Naked and Warm (1972)
 Ubaldo Terzani Horror Show (2010)
 Über Goober (2004)
 Ubojite misli (2006)
 Ubu et la Grande Gidouille (1979)
 Ubuntu (2017)
 Üç Korkusuz Arkadaş (1966)
 Uchakattam (1980)
 Uchathula Shiva (2016)
 Uchi Veyil (1990)
 Uchithanai Muharnthaal (2011)
 The Uchōten Hotel (2006)
 Uchu Daikaijū Dogora (1964)
 Uchu Enban Daisenso (1975)
 Uchū no hōsoku (1990)
 Ud i den kolde sne (1934)
 Udaan: (1997 & 2010)
 Udaharanam Sujatha (2017)
 Udal (2022)
 Udalaazham (2018)
 Udan Pirappu (1993)
 Udanchhoo (2018)
 Udanpirappe (2021)
 Udaya Geetham (1985)
 Udayam (1973)
 Udayam Kizhakku Thanne (1978)
 Udayam Padinjaru (1986)
 Udayanan Vasavadatta (1947)
 Udayananu Tharam (2005)
 Udayapuram Sulthan (1999)
 Udaykal (1930)
 Udayon (2005)
 Udedh Bun (2008)
 Udgharsha (2019)
 Udhaar (1949)
 Udhaar Ki Zindagi (1994)
 Udhaas (1993)
 Udhabaani (2009)
 Udhao (2013)
 Udhar Ka Sindur (1976)
 Udhavikku Varalaamaa (1998)
 Udhaya (2004)
 Udhayam NH4 (2015)
 Udhayan (2011)
 Udhyogastha (1967)
 Udta Punjab (2016)
 Udugan Yamaya (2007)
 Udumbara (2018)
 Udyaanalakshmi (1976)

Ue–Uk

 Ue o Muite Arukō: Sakamoto Kyu Monogatari (2005)
 Ue... paisano! (1953)
 Ufa con el sexo (1968)
 Uff! Yeh Mohabbat (1997)
 Ugadi: (1997 & 2007)
 Ugetsu (1953)
 Ugler i mosen (1959)
 Ugly (2014)
 The Ugly (1998)
 The Ugly American (1963)
 Ugly Aur Pagli (2008)
 The Ugly Boy (1918)
 The Ugly Dachshund (1966)
 UglyDolls (2019)
 The Ugly Duckling: (1920, 1931, 1939 & 1959)
 The Ugly Duckling and Me! (2006)
 Ugly Nasty People (2017)
 The Ugly Ones (1966)
 Ugly Me (2006)
 The Ugly Story (1966)
 The Ugly Swans (2006)
 The Ugly Truth (2009)
 Ugra Narasimham (1986)
 Ugramm (2014)
 The Uh-Oh! Show (2009)
 Uhlanga the Mark (2012)
 Ujala (1959)
 Ujeli: A Child Bride in Nepal (1992)
 Ujwadu (2011)
 Ukamau (1966)
 Ukare Gitsune Senbon Zakura (1954)
 Ukradená bitva (1972)
 Ukraine in Flames (1943)
 The Ukraine Hoax: Impeachment, Biden Cash, and Mass Murder (2020)
 Ukraine Is Not a Brothel (2013)
 Ukrainian Rhapsody (1961)
 Ukrainian Sheriffs (2015)
 Ukrainians in Exile (2022)
 Üks mu sõber (2011)

Ul

 Ula Leni (2019)
 Ulagam (1953)
 Ulagam Palavitham (1955)
 Ulagam Pirandhadhu Enakkaga (1990)
 Ulagam Sutrum Valiban (1973)
 Ulakam Chuttum Valiban (2011)
 Ulan (2019)
 Ułan Księcia Józefa (1937)
 Ułani, ułani, chłopcy malowani (1932)
 Ulath Ekai Pilath Ekai (2016)
 Ulavuthurai (1998)
 Ulbo Garvema (1917)
 Ulee's Gold (1997)
 Uli the Farmhand (1954)
 Uli the Tenant (1955)
 Ulice zpívá (1939)
 Ulidavaru Kandanthe (2014)
 Uljhan (1975)
 Uliyin Osai (2008)
 Ulkuthu (2017)
 Ulla, My Ulla (1930)
 Ullaasam (1997)
 Ulladakkam (1991)
 Ullam: (2005 & 2012)
 Ullam Ketkumae (2005)
 Ullam Kollai Poguthae (2001)
 Ullas (2012)
 Ullasa Paravaigal (1980)
 Ullasa Utsaha (2009)
 Ullasa Yaathra (1975)
 Ullasamga Utsahamga (2008)
 Ullasapoongattu (1997)
 Ullathai Allitha (1996)
 Ullathai Killathe (1999)
 Ullathil Kuzhanthaiyadi (1978)
 Ullathil Nalla Ullam (1988)
 Ulle Veliye (1993)
 Ulli and Marei (1948)
 Ulrike's Brain (2017)
 Ulsaha Committee (2014)
 Ulsavapittennu (1988)
 Ulta (2019)
 Ulta Palta: (1997 & 1998)
 Ulta Palta 69 (2007)
 Ulta Seedha (1985)
 Ulterior Motive (2015)
 Ulti Ganga (1942)
 The Ultimate Accessory (2013)
 Ultimate Avengers (2006)
 Ultimate Avengers 2: Rise of the Panther (2007)
 Ultimate Betrayal (1994)
 The Ultimate Christmas Present (2000 TV)
 Ultimate Deception (1999)
 Ultimate Force (2005)
 The Ultimate Gift (2007)
 Ultimate Hero (2016)
 The Ultimate Life (2013)
 The Ultimate Task (2013)
 Ultimate Teacher (1988)
 The Ultimate Thrill (1974)
 The Ultimate Vampire (1991)
 The Ultimate Warrior (1975)
 Ultimate X: The Movie (2002)
 Ultimatum: (1938 & 2009)
 Ultime grida dalla savana (1975)
 Ultimo minuto (1987)
 Ultimo mondo cannibale (1977)
 Ultimo tango a Zagarol (1973)
 Ultimul cartuș (1973)
 Ultra (1991)
 Ultra Q The Movie: Legend of the Stars (1990)
 Ultra Reinforcement (2012)
 Ultra Warrior (1990)
 Ultrachrist! (2003)
 Ultraman: The Adventure Begins (1987)
 Ultraman series:
 Ultraman: (1967 & 1979)
 Ultraman, Ultraseven: Great Violent Monster Fight (1969)
 Ultraman: Great Monster Decisive Battle (1979)
 Ultraman Zoffy: Ultra Warriors vs. the Giant Monster Army (1984)
 Ultraman Story (1984)
 Ultra Q The Movie: Legend of the Stars (1990)
 Ultraman Zearth (1996)
 Ultraman Tiga & Ultraman Dyna: Warriors of the Star of Light (1998)
 Ultraman Gaia: The Battle in Hyperspace (1999)
 Ultraman Tiga: The Final Odyssey (2000)
 Ultraman Cosmos: The First Contact (2001)
 Ultraman Cosmos 2: The Blue Planet (2002)
 Ultraman Cosmos vs. Ultraman Justice: The Final Battle (2003)
 Ultraman: The Next (2004)
 Ultraman Mebius & Ultraman Brothers (2006)
 Ultraman Zero: The Revenge of Belial (2010)
 Ultraman Saga (2012)
 Ultraman Ginga Theater Special (2013)
 Ultraman Ginga Theater Special: Ultra Monster Hero Battle Royal! (2014)
 Ultraman Ginga S The Movie (2015)
 Ultraman X The Movie (2016)
 Ultraman Orb The Movie (2017)
 Ultraman Geed the Movie (2018)
 Ultraman R/B the Movie (2019)
 Ultramarines: A Warhammer 40,000 Movie (2010)
 Ultras (2020)
 Ultrasonic (2012)
 Ultrasound (2021)
 Ultraviolet (2006)
 Ulysses: (1954, 1967 & 2011)
 Ulysses Against the Son of Hercules (1962)
 Ulysses' Gaze (1995)
 Ulzana (1974)
 Ulzana's Raid (1972)
 Ulzhan (2007)

Um

 Um Crime no Parque Paulista (1921)
 Um das Menschenrecht (1934)
 Um Show de Verão (2004)

Uma-Umu

 Uma: (2013 & 2018)
 Uma Aventura na Casa Assombrada (2009)
 Uma Aventura no Tempo (2007)
 Uma Chandi Gowri Shankarula Katha (1968)
 Uma Longa Viagem (2012)
 Uma Maheswara Ugra Roopasya (2020)
 Uma Sundari (1956)
 Umaanilayam (1984)
 Umar (2006)
 Umar 55 Ki Dil Bachpan Ka (1992)
 Umar Marvi (1956)
 Umar Qaid (1975)
 Umbartha (1982)
 Umberto D. (1952)
 Umbracle (1972)
 Umbrage (2009)
 Umbrella (2007)
 The Umbrella (1933)
 The Umbrella Coup (1980)
 The Umbrella Woman (1987)
 The Umbrellas of Cherbourg (1964)
 Umeed (2017)
 Umformung: The Transformation (2016)
 Umi no yarodomo (1957)
 Umizaru (2004)
 Umizaru 3: The Last Message (2010)
 Umma: (1960 & 2022)
 Ummachu (1971)
 Ummadi Kutumbam (1967)
 Ummeed: (1941 & 1962)
 Umoja: The Village Where Men Are Forbidden (2008)
 Umrao Jaan: (1981 & 2006)
 Umrao Jaan Ada (1972)
 Umrika (2015)
 Umurage (2002)
 Umurah (1999)
 Umurah Salaam (2008)
 Umut (1970)

Un

 Un'altra vita (1992)
 Un'estate ai Caraibi (2009)
 Un'estate al mare (2008)

Una

 Una (2016)
 Unabomber: The True Story (1996)
 Unacceptable Levels (2013)
 Unaccompanied Minors (2006)
 Unaccustomed As We Are (1929)
 The Unafraid (1915)
 Unakkaagave Vaazhgiren (1986)
 Unakkaga Ellam Unakkaga (1999)
 Unakkaga En Kadhal (2010)
 Unakkaga Mattum (2000)
 Unakkaga Naan (1976)
 Unakkaga Piranthen (1992)
 Unakkenna Venum Sollu (2015)
 Unakkul Naan (2015)
 Unakkum Enakkum (2006)
 The Unamenables (1959)
 Unarchigal: (1976 & 2005)
 Unarmed Verses (2017)
 Unaroo (1984)
 Unarthupattu (1980)
 Unashamed (1932)
 Unauthorized series:
 The Unauthorized Beverly Hills, 90210 Story (2015 TV)
 The Unauthorized Full House Story (2015 TV)
 The Unauthorized Melrose Place Story (2015 TV)
 The Unauthorized Saved by the Bell Story (2014 TV)
 Unaware (2010)

Unb

 The Unbearable Being of Lightness (2016)
 The Unbearable Lightness of Being (1988)
 The Unbearable Lightness of Inspector Fan (2015)
 The Unbearable Salesman (1957)
 The Unbearable Weight of Massive Talent (2022)
 Unbeatable (2013)
 Unbeatable Harold (2006)
 Unbeaten 28 (1980)
 Unbecoming Age (1992)
 Unbelievable!!!!! (2016)
 Unbelievable Adventures of Italians in Russia (1974)
 The Unbelievable Truth (1989)
 The Unbeliever (1918)
 The Unbelievers (2013)
 The Unborn: (1991 & 2009)
 The Unborn 2 (1994)
 Unborn but Forgotten (2002)
 Unborn in the USA (2007)
 Unbowed (2011)
 Unbreakable (2000)
 Unbreakable Kimmy Schmidt: Kimmy vs the Reverend (2020)
 Unbridled (2017)
 Unbroken (2014)
 Unbroken: Path to Redemption (2018)
 Unbroken Glass (2016)
 The Unburied Man (2004)

Unc

 Uncanny (2015)
 The Uncanny (1977)
 The Uncanny House (1916)
 Uncanny Valley (2015)
 Uncensored (1942)
 Uncertain Glory: (1944 & 2017)
 Uncertain Lady (1934)
 An Uncertain Season (1988)
 Uncertainty (2008)
 The Uncertainty Has Settled (2017)
 The Uncertainty Principle (2002)
 Unchained (1955)
 Unchained Memories (2003)
 The Unchanging Sea (1910)
 Uncharted (2022)
 Uncharted Channels (1920)
 Uncharted Live Action Fan Film (2018)
 Uncharted Seas (1921)
 The Unchastened Woman: (1918 & 1925)
 UnCivil Liberties (2006)
 Uncivil War Birds (1946)
 Uncivil Warriors (1935)
 Uncivilised (1936)
 Unclaimed: (2013 & 2016)
 Unclaimed Goods (1918)
 Uncle (2018)
 The Uncle (1965)
 The Uncle from America (1953)
 Uncle Boonmee Who Can Recall His Past Lives (2010)
 Uncle Bräsig (1936)
 Uncle Brian (2010)
 Uncle Buck (1989)
 Uncle Bun (1991)
 Uncle David (2010)
 Uncle Dick's Darling (1920)
 Uncle Donald's Ants (1952)
 Uncle Drew (2018)
 Uncle Frank (2020)
 Uncle Frans (1926)
 Uncle Howard (2016)
 Uncle Hyacynth (1956)
 Uncle Jasper's Will (1922)
 Uncle Joe (1941)
 Uncle Joe Shannon (1978)
 Uncle John (2015)
 Uncle Josh at the Moving Picture Show (1902)
 Uncle Kent (2011)
 Uncle Marin, the Billionaire (1979)
 Uncle Martino (1960)
 Uncle Meat (1987)
 Uncle Nick (2015)
 Uncle Nino (2003)
 Uncle Peckerhead (2020)
 The Uncle from Peking (1934)
 The Uncle from the Provinces (1926)
 Uncle Sam (1996)
 Uncle Silas (1947)
 The Uncle from Sumatra (1930)
 Uncle Thomas: Accounting for the Days (2019)
 Uncle Tom's Bungalow (1937)
 Uncle Tom's Cabaña (1947)
 Uncle Tom's Cabin: (1903, 1910, 1914, 1918, 1927, 1965 & 1987)
 Uncle Tom's Fairy Tales (TBD) 
 Uncle Tom's Uncle (1926)
 Uncle Vanya: (1957, 1963 & 1970)
 Uncle Was a Vampire (1959)
 The Uncles (2000)
 Uncle's Apartment (1913)
 Uncle's New Blazer (1915)
 Uncle's Paradise (2006)
 Unclenching the Fists (2021)
 Uncommon Friends of the 20th Century (1999)
 An Uncommon King (2011)
 Uncommon Valor (1983)
 Uncommon Women and Others (1978)
 The Uncondemned (2015)
 Unconditional (2012)
 Unconditional Love: (2002 & 2003 TV)
 Unconquered: (1917, 1947 & 1989 TV)
 The Unconquered (1956)
 Unconquered Bandit (1935)
 Unconquered Woman (1922)
 Unconstitutional: The War on Our Civil Liberties (2004)
 Unconvention: A Mix-Tape from St. Paul, RNC '08 (2009)
 Uncorked: (2009 & 2020)
 Uncovered (1994)
 Uncovered: The War on Iraq (2004)
 Uncross the Stars (2008)
 Uncut (1997)
 Uncut Gems (2019)

Und

 Und Jimmy ging zum Regenbogen (1971)
 Und wieder 48 (1948)
 Unda (2019)
 Undamma Bottu Pedata (1968)
 The Undead (1957)
 Undead (2003)
 Undead or Alive (2007)
 Undead Pool (2007)
 Undeclared War (1990)
 Undefeatable (1994)
 Undefeated: (2003 TV & 2011)
 The Undefeated: (1969, 2000 & 2011)
 Under Age: (1941 & 1964)
 Under Arizona Skies (1946)
 Under the Bed series:
 Under the Bed (2012)
 Under the Bed 2 (2014)
 Under the Bed 3 (2016)
 Under the Big Top (1938)
 Under the Black Eagle (1928)
 Under Blazing Heavens (1936)
 Under the Boardwalk (1989)
 Under the Boardwalk: The Monopoly Story (2011)
 Under the Bombs (2007)
 Under the Bridges (1946)
 Under Burning Skies (1912)
 Under California Stars (1948)
 Under Capricorn (1949)
 Under the Cards (1948)
 Under the Cherry Moon (1986)
 Under the Chinese Restaurant (1987)
 Under the City (1953)
 Under a Cloud (1937)
 Under Colorado Skies (1947)
 Under the Constellation Gemini (1979)
 Under Construction (2015)
 Under the Counter Spy (1954)
 Under Cover: (1916 & 1987)
 Under Cover of Night (1937)
 Under-Cover Man (1932)
 Under the Crescent (1915)
 Under Crimson Skies (1920)
 Under the Doctor (1976)
 The Under Dog (1932)
 Under the Dome (2015)
 Under the Domim Tree (1994)
 Under the Dragon's Tail (2005)
 Under the Eiffel Tower (2018)
 Under Eighteen (1931)
 Under Electric Clouds (2015)
 Under the Electric Sky (2014)
 Under en steinhimmel (1974)
 Under False Colors (1917)
 Under False Flag: (1932 & 1935)
 Under Fiesta Stars (1941)
 Under Fire: (1926, 1957 & 1983)
 Under the Flag of the Rising Sun (1972)
 Under the Frozen Falls (1948)
 Under the Gaslight (1914)
 Under the Glacier (1989)
 Under Great White Northern Lights (2009)
 Under the Greenwood Tree: (1918 & 1929)
 Under the Gun: (1951 & 1995)
 Under the Hawthorn Tree (2010)
 Under Heaven (1998)
 Under Heavy Fire (2001)
 Under the Hula Moon (1995)
 Under Jakob's Ladder (2011)
 Under a Jarvis Moon (2010)
 Under the Lantern (1928)
 Under the Lash (1921)
 Under the Leather Helmet (1932)
 Under the Lighthouse Dancing (1997)
 Under Mexicali Stars (1950)
 Under Milk Wood: (1972 & 2015)
 Under the Mountain (2009)
 Under the Mountains (1920)
 Under the Mud (2009)
 Under My Nails (2012)
 Under My Skin (1950)
 Under Nevada Skies (1946)
 Under New Management (1946)
 Under One Roof (2002)
 Under One Sky (1982)
 Under Our Skin (2008)
 Under the Palms (1999)
 Under the Pampas Moon (1935)
 Under the Pavement Lies the Strand (1975)
 Under the Piano (1995)
 Under Pressure (1935)
 Under Proof (1936)
 Under the Radar (2004)
 Under the Rainbow: (1981 & 2013)
 Under the Raven's Wing (2007)
 Under the Red Robe: (1915, 1923 & 1937)
 Under the Red Sea (1952)
 Under the Roofs of Paris (1930)
 Under the Rouge (1925)
 Under the Salt (2008)
 Under the Same Moon (2008)
 Under the Same Roof (2019)
 Under the Same Skin (1962)
 Under the Same Sky (1964)
 Under the Sand (2000)
 Under the Seas (1907)
 Under Secret Orders (1937)
 Under a Shadow (1915)
 Under the Shadow (2016)
 Under the Shadow of the Law (1913)
 Under Siege (1992)
 Under Siege 2: Dark Territory (1995)
 Under the Sign of Scorpio (1969)
 Under the Silver Lake (2018)
 Under the Skies of the Asturias (1951)
 Under the Skin: (1997 & 2013)
 Under the Skin of the City (2001)
 Under the Sky of Paris (1951)
 Under the Sky of Spain (1953)
 Under the Southern Cross: (1927, 1929 & 1938)
 Under Southern Skies: (1902 & 1915)
 Under the Spell of Silence (1916)
 Under the Stars: (2001 & 2007)
 Under the Stars of Capri (1953)
 Under Strange Flags (1937)
 Under the Sun: (1998 & 2015)
 Under the Sun of Rome (1948)
 Under the Sun of Satan (1987)
 Under Suspicion: (1918, 1919, 1930, 1991 & 2000)
 Under Ten Flags (1960)
 Under a Texas Moon (1930)
 Under Texas Skies: (1930 & 1940)
 Under the Thousand Lanterns (1952)
 Under the Tonto Rim: (1928, 1933 & 1947)
 Under the Top (1919)
 Under the Tree: (2008 & 2017)
 Under the Tuscan Sun (2003)
 Under Two Flags: (1916, 1922 & 1936)
 Under Two Jags (1923)
 Under the Volcano: (1984 & 2021)
 Under Western Eyes: (1936 & 1996)
 Under Western Skies: (1926 & 1945)
 Under Western Stars (1938)
 Under Wraps (1997 TV)
 Under the Yoke (1918)
 Under Your Hat (1940)
 Under Your Skin (1966)
 Under Your Spell (1936)
 Under the Yum Yum Tree (1963)
 The Underachievers (1987)
 Underclassman (2005)
 Undercover: (1943 American, 1943 British & 1983)
 Undercover Agent (1939)
 Undercover Angel (1999)
 Undercover Blues (1993)
 Undercover Brother (2002)
 Undercover Brother 2 (2019)
 Undercover Christmas (2003)
 Undercover Doctor (1939)
 Undercover Duet (2015)
 Undercover Girl (1950)
 Undercover Grandpa (2017)
 Undercover Kitty (2001)
 Undercover with the KKK (1979)
 Undercover Maisie (1947)
 Undercover Man: (1936 & 1942)
 Undercover Men (1934)
 The Undercover Woman (1946)
 Undercover X (2001)
 Undercurrent: (1946 & 2010)
 The Undercurrent (1919)
 Undercut (2004)
 Underdog (2007 & 2018)
 Underdog Kids (2015)
 Underdogs: (2013 American & 2013 Argentine)
 Underexposure (2005)
 Underfunded (2006)
 Underground: (1928, 1941, 1970, 1976, 1995 & 2020)
 Underground Aces (1981)
 The Underground Comedy Movie (1999)
 The Underground Eiger (1979 TV)
 Underground Lizard People (2011)
 The Underground Man (1981)
 Underground Rustlers (1941)
 Underground Secrets (1991)
 Underground U.S.A. (1980)
 The Underground World (1943)
 Underground: The Julian Assange Story (2012)
 Undermind (2003)
 The Underneath (1995)
 Underneath the Arches (1937)
 Undersea Kingdom (1936)
 Undersea Super Train: Marine Express (1979)
 The Understudy: (1976 & 2008)
 The Understudy: Graveyard Shift II (1988)
 The Undertaker: (1932 & 1988)
 The Undertow: (1915 & 1916)
 Undertow: (1930, 1949, 1996, 2004 & 2009)
 Undertow Eyes (2009)
 Undertrial (2007)
 Underwater (2020)
 Underwater! (1955)
 Underwater Dreams (2014)
 Underwater Love (2011)
 Underwater Warrior (1958)
 Underworld: (1927, 1937, 1985, 1996 & 2004)
 Underworld series:
 Underworld (2003)
 Underworld: Evolution (2006)
 Underworld: Rise of the Lycans (2009)
 Underworld: Endless War (2011)
 Underworld: Awakening (2012)
 Underworld: Blood Wars (2017)
 The Underworld (2018)
 Underworld Beauty (1958)
 The Underworld Story (1950)
 Underworld U.S.A. (1961)
 Undine: (1916 & 2020)
 Undiscovered (2005)
  Undisputed series:
 Undisputed (2002)
 Undisputed II: Last Man Standing (2006)
 Undisputed III: Redemption (2010)
 Undocumented (2010)
 Undoing (2006)
 Undrafted (2016)
 Undressed (1928)
 Undressing Extraordinary (1901)
 Undressing Israel: Gay Men in the Promised Land (2012)
 Undu Hoda Kondu Hoda (1992)
 The Undying (2011)
 The Undying Monster (1942)

Une

 Une Affaire de nègres (2006)
 Une blonde comme ça (1962)
 Une chambre en ville (1982)
 Une chance sur deux (1998)
 Une époque formidable... (1991)
 Une famille à louer (2015) 
 Une femme coquette (1955)
 Une Femme ou Deux (1985)
 Une Fenêtre ouverte (2005)
 Une fille et des fusils (1965)
 Une histoire banale (2014)
 Une idylle à la ferme (1912)
 Une liaison pornographique (1999)
 Une nuit à l'Assemblée Nationale (1988)
 Une nuit agitée (1912) 
 Une ravissante idiote (1964)
 Une sale histoire (1977)
 Une si jolie petite plage (1949)
 Une souris chez les hommes (1963)
 Une vie meilleure (2011)
 Une Visite (1950s)
 Unearth (2020)
 Unearthed (2006)
 Unearthed and Understood (2014)
 Unearthed & Untold: The Path to Pet Sematary (2017)
 The Unearthing (2015)
 The Unearthly (1957)
 Unearthly Stranger (1963)
 Uneasy Money: (1918 & 1926)
 Uneasy Terms (1948)
 Uneasy Virtue (1931)
 Uneven Fairways (2009)
 An Uneventful Story (1986)
 Unexpected: (2005 & 2015)
 Unexpected Conflict (1948)
 Unexpected Father (1939)
 The Unexpected Father (1932)
 Unexpected Guest (1947)
 Unexpected Love (2014)
 Unexpected Places: (1918 & 2012)
 Unexpected Race (2018)
 Unexpected Riches (1942)
 Unexpected Uncle (1941)
 Unexpectedly Yours (2017)

Unf

 Unfair trilogy:
 Unfair: The Movie (2007)
 Unfair 2: The Answer (2011)
 Unfair: The End (2015)
 Unfair Competition (2001)
 Unfair Dealing (2008)
 Unfair & Lovely (TBD)
 Unfair World (2011)
 The Unfair Sex (1926)
 Unfaithful: (1931 & 2002)
 The Unfaithful: (1947 & 1953)
 The Unfaithful Eckehart: (1931 & 1940)
 Unfaithful Mornings (1989)
 The Unfaithful Wife (1969)
 Unfaithfully Yours: (1948 & 1984)
 The Unfaithfuls (1953)
 Unfiltered Breathed In (2015)
 Unfinished (2018)
 An Unfinished Affair (1996 TV)
 Unfinished Business: (1941, 1977, 1984, 1985 Australian, 1985 American, 2009 & 2015)
 The Unfinished Comedy (1957)
 The Unfinished Conversation (2013)
 The Unfinished Dance (1947)
 An Unfinished Life (2005)
 An Unfinished Piece for Mechanical Piano (1977)
 Unfinished Sky (2007)
 Unfinished Spaces (2011)
 Unfinished Story (1955)
 Unfinished Supper (1979) 
 Unfinished Symphony (1934)
 Unfinished Symphony: Democracy and Dissent (2001)
 The Unfish (1997)
 The Unfolding (2016)
 Unfolding Florence: The Many Lives of Florence Broadhurst (2006)
 Unforgettable: (1996, 2014, 2016, & 2017)
 Unforgettable Blast (2015)
 The Unforgettable Character (1975)
 The Unforgettable Director of Love Movies (1990)
 Unforgettable Life (1988)
 An Unforgettable Summer (1994)
 Unforgettable Trail (1959)
 The Unforgettable Year 1919 (1951)
 Unforgivable: (1996 TV & 2011)
 The Unforgivable (2021)
 Unforgivable Blackness: The Rise and Fall of Jack Johnson (2005)
 Unforgiven: (1992, 2013 & 2018)
 The Unforgiven: (1960 & 2005)
 The Unforseen (1917)
 The Unfortunate Car (2012)
 The Unfortunate Policeman (1905)
 Unfreedom (2014)
 Unfriend (2014)
 Unfriended (2014)
 Unfriended: Dark Web (2018)
 The Unfrocked One (1954)

Ung–Unh

 Ungarala Rambabu (2017)
 Ungeküsst soll man nicht schlafen gehn (1936)
 An Ungentlemanly Act (1992 TV)
 Unglassed Windows Cast a Terrible Reflection (1953)
 Ungli (2014)
 The Ungrateful Heart (1951)
 Ungu Violet (2005)
 The Unguarded Hour: (1925 & 1936)
 The Unguarded Moment (1956)
 Unguarded Women (1924)
 Unhallowed Ground (2015)
 The Unhanged (1971)
 Unheimliche Geschichten: (1919 & 1932)
 Unhinged: (1982 & 2020)
 Unholy (2007)
 The Unholy: (1988 & 2021)
 Unholy Desire (1964)
 The Unholy Garden (1931)
 Unholy Love (1932)
 The Unholy Night (1929)
 Unholy Partners (1941)
 Unholy Rollers (1972)
 The Unholy Three: (1925 & 1930)
 The Unholy Wife (1957)
 Unholy Women (2006)
 Unhook the Stars (1996)
 UnHung Hero (2013)

Uni

 The Unicorn: (1978 & 2018)
 Unicorn Store (2017)
 Unicorn Wars (2022)
 Unidentified: (2006 & 2020)
 Unidentified Flying Oddball (1979)
 Uniform (2003)
 UnIndian (2015)
 Uninhabited (2010)
 The Uninhibited (1965)
 The Unintentional Kidnapping of Mrs. Elfriede Ott (2010)
 Uninvited: (1987 & 1999)
 The Uninvited: (1944, 1996 TV, 2003, 2008 & 2009)
 Uninvited Guest (1999)
 The Uninvited Guest: (1923, 1924, 1925 & 2004)
 The Union (2011)
 The Union: The Business Behind Getting High (2007)
 Union Depot (1932)
 Union Leader (2017)
 Union Maids (1976)
 Union Pacific (1939)
 Union of Salvation (2019)
 Union Square (2011)
 Union Station (1950)
 A Union in Wait (2001)
 Unique Brothers (2014)
 A Unique Spring (1957)
 United: (2003 & 2011)
 The United (TBD)
 United 300 (2007)
 United 93 (2006)
 United in Anger: A History of ACT UP (2012)
 A United Kingdom (2016)
 United Passions (2014)
 United Red Army (2007)
 United Six (2011)
 United Skates (2018)
 The United States of America (1975)
 The United States of Leland (2004)
 United States of Love (2016)
 United States Marine Band (1942)
 United States Smith (1928)
 United We Stand (2003)
 Unity (2015)
 The Universal Language (2011)
 Universal Signs (2008)
 Universal Soldier (1971)
 Universal Soldier series:
 Universal Soldier (1992)
 Universal Soldier II: Brothers in Arms (1998)
 Universal Soldier III: Unfinished Business (1998)
 Universal Soldier: The Return (1999)
 Universal Soldier: Regeneration (2010)
 Universal Soldier: Day of Reckoning (2012)
 Universal Soldiers (2007)
 Universe: (1960 & 1976)
 University (2002)
 University Heights (2004)

Unj–Unk

 The Unjust (2010)
 The Unjust Angel (1954)
 Unjustified Absence (1939)
 The Unkabogable Praybeyt Benjamin (2011)
 The Unkindness of Ravens (2016)
 The Unkissed Bride (1966)
 Unknown: (2006 & 2011)
 The Unknown: (1913, 1915 comedy, 1915 drama, 1927, 1936, & 1946)
 Unknown Brood (2016)
 The Unknown Cavalier (1926)
 Unknown Chaplin (1983 TV)
 The Unknown Dancer (1929)
 The Unknown Girl (2016)
 The Unknown Guest (1943)
 Unknown Island (1948)
 The Unknown Known (2013)
 The Unknown Lover (1925)
 The Unknown Man (1951)
 Unknown Man of San Marino (1946)
 The Unknown Man of Shandigor (1967)
 The Unknown Mariachi (1953)
 Unknown of Monte Carlo (1939)
 The Unknown Ocean (1964)
 Unknown Path (1946)
 Unknown Pleasures (2002)
 The Unknown Policeman (1941)
 The Unknown Purple (1923)
 The Unknown Quantity (1919)
 The Unknown Ranger (1936)
 Unknown Sender (1950)
 The Unknown Singer (1947)
 The Unknown Soldier: (1926, 1955, 1985 & 2017)
 The Unknown Terror (1957)
 The Unknown Tomorrow (1923)
 Unknown Treasures (1926)
 Unknown White Male (2005)
 The Unknown Woman (2006)
 Unknown World (1951)
 The Unknown World (2012)

Unl

 Unlawful Entry (1992)
 Unlawful Killing (2011)
 The Unlawful Trade (1914)
 Unleashed: (2005 & 2016)
 Unless (2016)
 Unless the Water Is Safer than the Land (2018)
 Unlikely Angel (1996)
 Unlikely Revolutionaries (2010)
 Unlisted Owner (2017)
 Unlocked: (2006 & 2017)
 Unlocking the Cage (2016)
 Unlocking the Mystery of Life (2003)
 Unlovable (2018)
 Unloved (2001)
 The Unloved (2009)
 The Unloved Woman: (1914, 1940 & 1949)
 Unlucky Plaza (2014)

Unm

 Unmade Beds: (1997 & 2009)
 Unmaiye Un Vilai Enna? (1976)
 Unman, Wittering and Zigo (1971)
 Unmanned: America's Drone Wars (2013)
 Unmarried: (1920 & 1939)
 Unmarried Daughters (1926)
 Unmarried Mothers (1976)
 An Unmarried Woman (1978)
 The Unmarried Woman (1917)
 The Unmarried Wife (2016)
 Unmasked: (1917 & 1950)
 Unmasked Part 25 (1988)
 The Unmasking (1914)
 Unmatched (2010)
 The Unmentionables (1963)
 Unmistaken Child (2008)

Unn–Uno

 Unna Nenachen Pattu Padichen (1992)
 Unna ja Nuuk (2006)
 Unnai Charanadaindhen (2003)
 Unnai Kann Theduthe (2009)
 Unnai Kann Theduthey (2000)
 Unnai Kodu Ennai Tharuven (2000)
 Unnai Naan Santhithen (1984)
 Unnai Ninaithu (2002)
 Unnai Solli Kutramillai (1990)
 Unnai Suttrum Ulagam (1977)
 Unnai Thedi (1999)
 Unnai Thedi Varuven (1985)
 Unnai Vaazhthi Paadugiren (1992)
 Unnaipol Oruvan: (1965 & 2009)
 Unnal Mudiyum Thambi (1988)
 Unnale Unnale (2007)
 Unnam (2012)
 The Unnamable (1988)
 The Unnamable II: The Statement of Randolph Carter (1993)
 The Unnamed (2016)
 The Unnamed Zone (2006)
 Unnaruge Naan Irundhal (1999)
 Unnathangalil (2001)
 Unnatural & Accidental (2006)
 Unnatural History (1959)
 The Unnaturals (1969)
 Unnecessary Fuss (1984)
 The Unnecessary Sex (1915)
 Unni: (1989 & 2007)
 Unni Vanna Divasam (1984)
 Unnidathil Ennai Koduthen (1998)
 Unnikale Oru Kadha Parayam (1987)
 Unnikrishnante Adyathe Christmas (1988)
 Unnikuttanu Joli Kitti (1989)
 Unnimaya (2000)
 Unnodu Ka (2016)
 Unnudan (1999)
 Uno (2004)
 Uno contro l'altro, praticamente amici (1981)
 Uno di più all'inferno (1968)
 Uno y medio contra el mundo (1973)
 Unofficially Yours (2012)
 Unoponchash Batash (2020)
 Unos Pocos con Valor (2010)

Unp–Unr

 The Unpainted Woman (1919)
 The Unpardonable Sin (1919)
 Unpaused (2020)
 Unplanned (2019)
 Unplugging (2022)
 Unprecedented: The 2000 Presidential Election (2002)
 The Unprecedented Defence of the Fortress Deutschkreuz (1966)
 Unpregnant (2020)
 Unprotected (1916)
 Unpublished Story (1942)
 Unquiet Graves (2018)
 Unraveled (2011)
 An Unreasonable Man (2006)
 Unrelated (2007)
 Unrest: (2006 & 2017)
 Unrestrained Youth (1925)
 The Unreturned (2010)
 Unripe Fruit (1934)
 Unrivaled (2010)
 Unrivaled: Earnhardt vs. Gordon (2019)
 Unruled Paper (2002)
 The Unruly Hare (1945)

Uns

 Les Uns et les Autres (1981)
 The Unsaid (2001)
 Unsalted: A Great Lakes Experience (2005)
 Unsane (2018)
 The Unsaved (2013)
 The Unscarred (2000)
 The Unscrupulous Ones (1962)
 The Unseeable (2006)
 Unseeing Eyes (1923)
 The Unseen: (1945, 1980 & 2016)
 Unseen Enemy (1942)
 An Unseen Enemy (1912)
 Unseen Evil (2001)
 Unseen Forces (1920)
 Unseen Hands (1924)
 The Unseen Vengeance (1914)
 Unseen Wonder (1984)
 Unser täglich Brot (1949)
 Unsettled (2007)
 Unsettled Land (1987)
 The Unshrinkable Jerry Mouse (1964)
 The Unsinkable Molly Brown (1964)
 Unspeakable: (2000 & 2002)
 The Unspeakable (1924)
 The Unspeakable Act (2012)
 Unspoken (2008)
 Unstoppable: (2004, 2010, 2013 & 2018)
 Unstoppable: Conversation with Melvin Van Peebles, Gordon Parks, and Ossie Davis (2005)
 The Unstoppable Man (1960)
 Unstoppable Marriage (2007)
 Unstrung Heroes (1995)
 Unsubscribe (2020)
 An Unsuitable Job for a Woman (1982)
 Unsullied (2014)
 The Unsuspected (1947)
 The Unsuspecting Angel (1936)

Unt

 Untamable Angelique (1967)
 The Untamable Whiskers (1904)
 Untamagiru (1989)
 Untamed: (1929, 1940, 1955 & 1957)
 The Untamed: (1920 & 2016)
 The Untamed Breed (1948)
 Untamed Frontier (1952)
 Untamed Fury (1947)
 Untamed Heart (1993)
 Untamed Heiress (1954)
 The Untamed Lady (1926)
 Untamed Romania (2018)
 Untamed Women (1952)
 Untamed Youth: (1924 & 1957)
 Unter dem Rauschen deiner Wimpern (1951)
 Unterm Radar (2015)
 Unternehmen Michael (1937)
 Unterwerfung (2018)
 Unthinkable (2010)
 The Unthinkable: (1926 & 2018)
 Until the Birds Return (2017)
 Until the Day We Meet Again (1932)
 Until Death: (1988 & 2007)
 Until the End of Time (2017)
 Until the End of the World (1991)
 Until Forever (2016)
 Until the Light Takes Us (2008)
 Until Midnight (2018)
 Until Money Departs You (1960)
 Until Next Spring (1960)
 Until the Night (2004)
 Until Nothing Remains (2010)
 Until September (1984)
 Until They Sail (1957)
 Until We Meet Again: (1950 & 1952)
 Untitled (2011)
 (Untitled) (2009)
 Unto the Dusk (2014)
 Unto the Third Generation (1913)
 Unto Those Who Sin (1916)
 Unto the Weak (1914)
 The Untitled Kartik Krishnan Project (2010)
 Untogether (2018)
 The Untold (2003)
 Untold Scandal (2003)
 The Untold Story (1993)
 The Untold Story 2 (1998)
 The Untold Tale of the Three Kingdoms (2020)
 Untouchable (2019)
 Untouchable Lawman (2015)
 The Untouchables (1987)
 Untouched (1954)
 The Untouched Woman (1925)
 Untraceable (2008)
 Untuk Angeline (2016)
 Untypical Story (1977)

Unu-Unz

 Unusable (1917)
 Unusual Exhibition (1968)
 An Unusual Summer (1957)
 The Unusual Past of Thea Carter (1929)
 The Unusual Youth (2005)
 The Unvanquished (1964)
 Unvanquished City (1950)
 The Unveiling Hand (1919)
 Unwanted (2017)
 The Unwanted: (1924, 1951 & 2014)
 Unwanted Cinema (2005)
 The Unwanted Girl (1953)
 Unwanted Soldiers (1999)
 Unwed Mother (1958)
 The Unwelcome Guest (1913)
 The Unwelcome Mrs. Hatch (1914)
 The Unwelcome Stranger (1935)
 An Unwilling Hero (1921)
 The Unwritten Code: (1919 & 1944)
 The Unwritten Law: (1907, 1922, 1925, 1929, 1932 & 1985)
 Unzipped (1995)

Uo

 Uomini ombra (1954)
 Un uomo a metà (1966)
 Un uomo ritorna (1946)

Up

 Up: (1984 & 2009)
 Up the Academy (1980)
 Up Against It (1912)
 Up in the Air: (1940 & 2009)
 Up in Arms (1944)
 Up from the Beach (1965)
 Up in the Cellar (1970)
 Up in Central Park (1948)
 Up to a Certain Point (1983)
 Up the Chastity Belt (1971)
 Up Close & Personal (1996)
 Up the Creek: (1958 & 1984)
 Up for the Cup: (1931 & 1950)
 Up in Daisy's Penthouse (1953)
 Up Denali 3D (2003)
 Up from the Depths (1979)
 Up for the Derby (1933)
 Up and Down: (1965 & 2004)
 Up the Down Staircase (1967)
 Up and at 'Em (1922)
 Up the Establishment (1969)
 Up in Flames (1973)
 Up Front (1951)
 Up the Front (1972)
 Up Goes Maisie (1946)
 Up for Grabs (2004)
 Up to His Ears (1965)
 Up to His Neck (1954)
 Up Jumped the Devil (1941)
 Up Jumped a Swagman (1965)
 Up the Junction (1968)
 Up the Ladder (1925)
 Up with the Lark (1943)
 Up for Love (2016)
 Up in Mabel's Room: (1926 & 1944)
 Up the MacGregors! (1967)
 Up for Murder (1931)
 Up to the Neck (1933)
 Up North (2018)
 Up to Our Necks (2004)
 Up Periscope (1959)
 Up Pompeii (1971)
 Up Pops the Devil (1931)
 Up Pops the Duke (1931)
 Up from the Ranks (1943)
 Up the Ridge (2006)
 Up for the Rising Sun (1997)
 Up the River: (1930 & 1938)
 Up the Road with Sallie (1918)
 Up Romance Road (1918)
 Up the Sandbox (1972)
 Up in Smoke: (1957 & 1978)
 The Up-Standing Sitter (1948)
 Up Syndrome (2001)
 Up There (2011)
 An Up-to-Date Conjuror (1899)
 Up a Tree: (1930 & 1955)
 Up 'n' Under (1998)
 Up at the Villa (2000)
 Up in the Wind (2013)
 Up in the World (1956)
 Up the Yangtze (2007)
 Up Your Alley (1989)
 Up Your Legs Forever (1971)
 Up, Down, Fragile (1995)
 Up, Up and Away (2000 TV)
 Up! (1976)

Upa–Upp

 Upa en apuros (1942)
 Upaasna (1971)
 Upacharapoorvam Gunda Jayan (2022)
 Upaharam (1985)
 Upasane (1974)
 Upbeat in Music (1943)
 Upendra (1999)
 Upendra Matte Baa (2017)
 Upgrade (2018)
 Uphaar (1971)
 Uphill All the Way (1986)
 The Uphill Path (1918)
 Upin & Ipin: Jeng Jeng Jeng! (2016)
 Upin & Ipin: Keris Siamang Tunggal (2019)
 Upír z Feratu (1982)
 Upkar (1967)
 The Upland Rider (1928)
 The Uplifters (1919)
 Upon the Magic Roads (2021)
 Upon the Shadow (2017)
 Uppalawanna (2007)
 Uppena (2021)
 The Upper Footage (2013)
 The Upper Hand (1966)
 Upper World (1934)
 Upperdog (2009)
 Uppi 2 (2015)
 Uppi Dada M.B.B.S. (2006)
 Uppi Rupee (TBD)
 Uppina Kagada (2017)
 Uppu (1987)
 Uppu Huli Khara (2017)
 Uppu Karuvaadu (2015)
 Uppukandam Brothers (1993)
 Uppukandam Brothers: Back in Action (2011)

Upr–Upt

 Upright Magic (1975)
 Uprising: (2001 & 2012)
 The Uprising (1912)
 Uproar in Damascus (1939)
 Uproar in the Studio (1926)
 Ups and Downs: (1915, 1937 & 1983)
 The Ups and Downs (1914)
 The Ups and Downs of a Handyman (1976)
 Ups 'n Downs (1931)
 The Upsetter (2008)
 Upside (2010)
 The Upside (2019)
 The Upside of Anger (2005)
 Upside Down: (1919, 2012 & 2015)
 Upside Down: The Creation Records Story (2010)
 Upside Down; or, the Human Flies (1899)
 Upside-Down Magic (2020)
 The Upside-down Triangle (2016)
 Upstage (1926)
 Upstairs (1919)
 Upstairs and Down (1919)
 Upstairs and Downstairs: (1925 & 1959)
 Upstarts (2017)
 Upstream (1927)
 Upstream Color (2013)
 Upswept Hare (1952)
 The Upthrown Stone (1969)
 Uptight (1968)
 Uptown: (1987 & 2009)
 Uptown Girls (2003)
 Uptown New York (1932)
 Uptown Saturday Night (1974)
 The Upturned Glass (1947)

Ur

 Urakkam Varaatha Raathrikal (1978)
 The Ural Front (1944)
 Uran Khatola (1955)
 Urangatha Ninaivugal (1983)
 Urangatha Sundary (1969)
 Uranium Boom (1956)
 The Uranium Conspiracy (1978)
 Uranus (1990)
 Urashima Tarō (1918)
 Uravadum Nenjam (1976)
 Uravai Kaatha Kili (1984)
 Uravukku Kai Koduppom (1975)
 Urban Cowboy (1980)
 Urban Decay (2007)
 Urban Explorer (2011)
 Urban Explorers: Into the Darkness (2007)
 Urban Feel (1998)
 Urban Games (2014)
 Urban Ghost Story (1998)
 Urban Hymn (2015)
 Urban Justice (2007)
 Urban Legend series:
 Urban Legend (1998)
 Urban Legends: Final Cut (2000)
 Urban Legends: Bloody Mary (2005)
 Urban Menace (1999)
 Urban Myths (2022)
 Urban Safari (1996)
 Urban Terrorist (1998)
 Urbania (2000)
 Urbanized (2011)
 Urchagam (2007)
 Urchin (2007)
 Urduja (2008)
 Ureinung (2013)
 Ureme series:
 Ureme 1 (1986)
 Ureme 2 (1986)
 Ureme 3 (1987)
 Ureme 4 (1987)
 Ureme 5 (1988)
 Ureme 6 (1989)
 Ureme 7 (1992)
 Ureshi Hazukashi Monogatari (1988)
 The Urethra Chronicles (1999)
 The Urethra Chronicles II: Harder Faster Faster Harder (2002)
 Urge (2016)
 Urge to Build (1981)
 Urge to Kill (1960)
 Urgent (2018)
 Urgh! A Music War (1982)
 Uri: The Surgical Strike (2019)
 Urimai (1985)
 Urimai Geetham (1988)
 Urimai Oonjaladugiradhu (1992)
 Urimai Por (1998)
 Urimaikural (1974)
 Uriyadi: (2016 & 2020)
 Uriyadi 2 (2019)
 Urlaub auf Ehrenwort: (1938 & 1955)
 Uro (2006)
 Ursula, the Girl from the Finnish Forests (1953)
 Ursus (1961)
 Ursus in the Land of Fire (1963)
 Ursus and the Tartar Princess (1961)
 Ursus in the Valley of the Lions (1962)
 Uru (2017)
 Urubu (1948)
 Urudhi Mozhi (1990)
 Urukku Manushyan (1986)
 Urumattram (2003)
 Urumbukal Urangarilla (2015)
 Urumeen (2015)
 Urumi (2011)
 Urusei Yatsura series:
 Urusei Yatsura: Only You (1983)
 Urusei Yatsura 2: Beautiful Dreamer (1984)
 Urusei Yatsura 3: Remember Me (1985)
 Urusei Yatsura 4: Lum the Forever (1986)
 Urusei Yatsura: The Final Chapter (1988)
 Urusei Yatsura: Always My Darling (1991)
 Uruvam (1991)
 Uruvangal Maralam (1983)
 Urvashi Bharathi (1973)
 Urvashi Kalyana (1993)
 Urvi (2017)

Us

 Us: (1991 TV & 2019)
 Us Again (2021)
 Us Kids (2020)
 Us Now (2009)
 Us and Our Education (2009)
 Us Paar (1974)
 Us and Them (2018)
 Us Two (1979)
 Us in the U.S. (2013)
 Used Cars (1980)
 Used People (1992)
 A Useful Life (2010)
 Useless (2007)
 Useless Humans (2020)
 The Users (1978 TV)
 Usfahrt Oerlike (2015)
 Usha Haran (1940)
 Usha Kalyanam (1936)
 Usha Parinayam (1961)
 Usher (2004)
 Ushpizin (2004)
 Usire (2001)
 Uski Roti (1969)
 Uśmiech zębiczny (1957)
 Usne Kaha Tha (1960)
 Uss Paar (1944)
 Ustaad (1999)
 Ustad Hotel (2012)
 Ustadi Ustad Se (1982)
 Ustadon Ke Ustad: (1963 & 1998)
 Ustedes los ricos (1948)
 The Usual Suspects (1995)

Ut

 Ut av mørket (1958)
 Utah (1945)
 Utah Blaine (1957)
 The Utah Kid: (1930 & 1944)
 The Utah Trail (1938)
 Utah Wagon Train (1951)
 Utamaro and His Five Women (1946)
 Utatama (2008)
 Uthama Purushan (1989)
 Uthama Puthiran: (1940 & 1958)
 Uthama Raasa (1993)
 Uthaman: (1976 & 2001)
 Uthamaputhiran (2010)
 Uthami (1985)
 Uthami Petra Rathinam (1960)
 Utharam (1989)
 Utharaswayamvaram (2009)
 Uthiripookkal (1979)
 Uthrada Rathri (1978)
 Uththara (2010)
 Utilities (1983)
 Utkarsha (1990)
 Utopia: (1983, 2013 & 2015)
 The Utopian Society (2003)
 Utopians (2015)
 Utopiayile Rajavu (2015)
 Utøya: July 22 (2018)
 Utrpení mladého Boháčka (1969)
 Utsab (2000)
 Utsav (1984)
 Utsavam (1975)
 Utsavamelam (1992)
 Utshimassits: Place of the Boss (1996)
 Utt Pataang (2011)
 Uttar Dakshin (1987)
 Uttar Falguni (1963)
 Uttar Purush (1966)
 Uttara (2000)
 Utu (1983)
 Utz (1992)

Uu–Uz

 Uu Kodathara? Ulikki Padathara? (2012)
 Uuno Epsanjassa (1985)
 Uuno Turhapuro series:
 Uuno Turhapuro (1973)
 Professori Uuno D.G. Turhapuro (1975)
 Lottovoittaja UKK Turhapuro (1976)
 Uuno Turhapuro armeijan leivissä (1984)
 Uuno Epsanjassa (1985)
 Uuno Turhapuro muuttaa maalle (1986)
 Uuno Turhapuro – kaksoisagentti (1987)
 Uuno Turhapuro – Suomen tasavallan herra presidentti (1992)
 Uuno Turhapuro – This Is My Life (2004)
 Uvaa (2015)
 Uvanga (2013)
 Uvvu (1982)
 Uwantme2killhim? (2013)
 Uwiedziona (1931)
 Uyarangalil (1984)
 Uyare (2019)
 Uyarndha Manithan (1968) 
 Uyarndha Ullam (1985)
 Uyarndhavargal (1977)
 Uyarthiru 420 (2011)
 Uyarum Njan Nadake (1985)
 Uyir (2006)
 Uyir Mel Aasai (1967)
 Uyira Maanama (1968)
 Uyire Unakkaga (1986)
 Uyire Uyire (2016)
 Uyirile Kalanthathu (2000)
 Uyirin Yedai 21 Ayiri (2011)
 Uyirodu Uyiraga (1998)
 Uyirthezhunnelppu (1985)
 Uyirullavarai Usha (1983)
 Uyun sahira (1934)
 Uyyala Jampala (2013)
 Uyyale (1969)
 Uzak (2002)
 Uzhaikkum Karangal (1976)
 Uzhaippali (1993)
 Uzhaithu Vaazha Vendum (1988)
 Uzhavan (1993)
 Uzhavan Magan (1987)
 Uzhavukkum Thozhilukkum Vandhanai Seivom (1959)
 Uzhiyan (1994)
 Uzumaki (2000)

V

 V: (2020 & 2021)
 V pokušení (1939)
 V for Vendetta (2005)
 V for Visa (2013)
 V2: Dead Angel (2007)
 V Day (2021)
 V-Day: Until the Violence Stops (2003)
 VDF Thasana (2014)
 VFW (2019)
 V/H/S series: 
 V/H/S (2012)
 V/H/S/2 (2013)
 V/H/S: Viral (2014)
 V/H/S/94 (2021)
 V/H/S/99 (2022)
 V/H/S/85 (2023)
 V.I.P. (2017)
 VIPs (2010)
 The V.I.P.s (1963)
 V. I. P. (1997)
 V.I. Warshawski (1991)

Va

 Va (2010)
 Va a ser que nadie es perfecto (2006)
 Va banque (1920)
 Va savoir (2001)

Vaa

 Vaa Arugil Vaa (1991)
 Vaa Kanna Vaa (1982)
 Vaa Magale Vaa (1994)
 Vaa Raja Vaa (1969)
 Vaachalam (1997)
 Vaada (2005)
 Vaada Poda Nanbargal (2011)
 Vaada Raha (2009)
 Vaadaa (2010)
 Vaadaka Gunda (1989)
 Vaadamalli (2011)
 Vaade Iraade (1994)
 Vaade Veedu (1973)
 Vaadhdivsachya Haardik Shubhechcha (2014)
 Vaadhyar (2012)
 Vaagai Sooda Vaa (2011)
 Vaah! Life Ho Toh Aisi! (2005)
 Vaai Kozhuppu (1989)
 Vaaimai (2016)
 Vaaitha (2022)
 Vaajlaach Paahije - Game Ki Shinema (2015)
 Vaaleduthaven Vaalaal (1979)
 Vaalee: (1999 & 2001)
 Vaaliba Raja (2016)
 Vaalmiki (2009)
 Vaaloabi Engeynama (2006)
 Vaalu (2015)
 Vaamanan (2009)
 Vaan (TBD)
 Vaana (2008)
 Vaanam (2011)
 Vaanam Kottattum (2020)
 Vaanam Vasappadum (2004)
 Vaaname Ellai (1992)
 Vaanathaippola (2000)
 Vaanavil (2000)
 Vaanavil Vaazhkai (2015)
 Vaanchinathan (2001)
 Vaandu (2019)
 Vaanku (2021)
 Vaanmathi (1996)
 Vaapsi (2016)
 Vaanga Partner Vaanga (1994)
 Vaaraayo Vennilaave (2017)
 Vaaranam Aayiram (2008)
 Vaarasatwam (1964)
 Vaareva (2011)
 Vaarikkuzhiyile Kolapathakam (2019)
 Vaarikuzhi (1982)
 Vaashey Mashaa Ekee (2016)
 Vaashi: (1983 & 2022)
 Vaastav: The Reality (1999)
 Vaasthavam (2006)
 Vaastu Prakaara (2015)
 Vaastu Shastra (2004)
 Vaasu Naan Pakka Commercial (2018)
 Vaathiyaar Veettu Pillai (1989)
 Vaayai Moodi Pesavum (2014)
 Vaazha Vaitha Deivam (1959)
 Vaazhga Jananayagam (1996)
 Vaazhkai: (1949 & 1984)
 Vaazhkai Chakkaram (1990)
 Vaazhkai Oppandham 1959)
 Vaazhkai Padagu (1965)
 Vaazhl (2021)
 Vaazhnthu Kaattugiren (1975)
 Vaazhthugal (2008)
 Vaazhve Mayam (1970)

Vab–Vae

 Vabank (1981)
 Vacaciones de terror (1989)
 Vacancy (2007)
 Vacancy 2: The First Cut (2009)
 Vacancy in Vaughn Street (1963)
 The Vacancy (1981)
 Vacant Possession (1995)
 Una vacanza del cactus (1981)
 Vacanze a Ischia (1957)
 Vacanze di Natale (1983)
 Vacanze di Natale '90 (1990)
 Vacanze di Natale '91 (1991)
 Vacanze di Natale '95 (1995)
 Vacanze di Natale 2000 (1999)
 Vacanze di Natale a Cortina (2011)
 Vacanze in America (1984)
 Vacas (1992)
 Vacation: (2005 & 2015)
 Vacation Days (1947)
 Vacation with Derek (2010)
 Vacation Friends (2021) 
 Vacation with a Gangster (1951)
 A Vacation in Hell (1979 TV)
 Vacation from Love (1938)
 Vacation from Marriage (1927)
 Vacation of Petrov and Vasechkin, Usual and Incredible (1984)
 Vacation in Reno (1946)
 Vacationland (2006)
 Vacations (1947)
 Vacations in Acapulco (1961)
 Vacations in Majorca (1959)
 Vacations in the Other World (1942)
 Vachan: (1938 & 1955)
 Vachanam (1990)
 Vachina Kodalu Nachindi (1959)
 Vacuuming Completely Nude in Paradise (2001 TV)
 Vada Chennai (2018)
 Vadacurry (2014)
 Vadagupatti Maapillai (2001)
 Vadaka Veedu (1979)
 Vadakakku Oru Hridayam (1978)
 Vadakkumnadhan (2006)
 Vadakkunokkiyantram (1989)
 Vaddante Dabbu (1954)
 Vaddu Bava Thappu (1994)
 Vader Episode I: Shards of the Past (2018)
 Vadhayiyaan Ji Vadhayiyaan (2018)
 Vadina (1955)
 Vadivukku Valai Kappu (1962)
 Vado a riprendermi il gatto (1987)
 Vaettiya Madichu Kattu (1998)

Vaf–Vaj

 Vafaatheri Kehiveriya (2016)
 Vagabond: (1950 & 1985)
 The Vagabond: (1916 & 1953)
 The Vagabond Cub (1929)
 The Vagabond King: (1930 & 1956)
 Vagabond Lady (1935)
 Vagabond Loafers (1949)
 The Vagabond Lover (1929)
 The Vagabond Prince (1916)
 The Vagabond Queen (1929)
 The Vagabond Trail (1924)
 Vagabonderne på Bakkegården (1958)
 The Vagabonds: (1912, 1916, 1937 & 1939)
 Vagdanam (1961)
 Vägen ut (1999)
 The Vagrant (1992)
 Vagrant Bus (1990)
 Vai avanti tu che mi vien da ridere (1982)
 Vai que Dá Certo (2013)
 Vai que É Mole (1960)
 Vai Pandal (1984)
 Vai Que Cola - O Filme (2015)
 Vai Raja Vai (2015)
 Vai Trabalhar, Vagabundo! (1973)
 Vaidehi (2009)
 Vaidehi Kalyanam (1991)
 Vaidehi Kathirunthal (1984)
 Vaigai (2009)
 Vaigai Express (2017)
 Vaigasi Poranthachu (1990)
 Vaiki Odunna Vandi (1987)
 Vaiki Vanna Vasantham (1980)
 Vaimaye Vellum (1997)
 Vaincre à Olympie (1977)
 Vaira (2017)
 Vaira Maalai (1954)
 Vaira Nenjam (1975)
 Vairagyam (1987)
 Vairam (1974)
 Vairam: Fight for Justice (2009)
 Vaisakhi List (2016)
 Vaisali (1988)
 Vaishakada Dinagalu (1993)
 Vaishnavee (2018)
 Vaitheeswaran (2008)
 Vajont (2001)
 Vajraghat (1992)
 Vajrakaya (2015)
 Vajram: (1995, 2004 & 2015)
 Vajrayudha (1992)

Vak

 Vakeel Saab (2021)
 Vakil Babu (1982)
 Vakil Saheb (1943)
 Vakinuvinama (2010)
 Vakkalathu Narayanankutty (2001)
 Vakkeel Vasudev (1993)
 Vakkuruthi (1973)
 Vakratunda Mahakaaya (2015)

Val

 Val (2021)
 Val Lewton: The Man in the Shadows (2007)
 Vala In London (2003)
 The Valachi Papers (1972)
 Valar Pirai (1962)
 Valarthumrugangal (1981)
 Valayal Satham (1987)
 Valayapathi (1952)
 Valdez Is Coming (1971)
 Valencia: (1926 & 1927)
 Valente Quintero (1973)
 Valentín (2002)
 Valentina: (1950 & 2008)
 Valentine (2001)
 The Valentine Girl (1917)
 Valentine Road (2013)
 Valentine's Day: (2007 & 2010)
 Valentino: (1951 & 1977)
 Valentino: The Last Emperor (2009)
 Valerian and the City of a Thousand Planets (2017)
 Valerie (1957)
 Valerie and Her Week of Wonders (1970)
 Valery Chkalov (1941)
 The Valet: (2006 & 2022)
 Valet Girls (1987)
 The Valet's Wife (1908)
 Valhalla: (1986, 2013 & 2019)
 Valhalla Rising (2009)
 Valiant (2005)
 The Valiant: (1929 & 1962)
 The Valiant Hombre (1948)
 Valiant Is the Word for Carrie (1936)
 The Valiant Navigator (1935)
 The Valiant Ones (1975)
 Valiba Virundhu (1967)
 Valibamey Vaa Vaa (1982)
 Valimai (2022)
 Valiyangadi (2010)
 Valiyavan (2015)
 Valkannadi (2002)
 Valkyrie (2008)
 Valla Desam (2017)
 Vallakottai (2010)
 Vallal (1997)
 Vallamai Tharayo (2008)
 Vallarasu (2000)
 Vallatha Pahayan (2013)
 Vallavan (2006)
 Vallavan Oruvan (1966)
 Vallavanukku Pullum Aayudham (2014)
 Vallavanukku Vallavan (1965)
 Valleem Thetti Pulleem Thetti (2016)
 The Valley: (1972, 1976, 2014, & 2017)
 Valley of Angels (2008)
 The Valley of the Bees (1968)
 The Valley Below (2014)
 Valley of Bones (2017)
 The Valley of Death (1968)
 The Valley of Decision (1945)
 Valley of Eagles (1951)
 The Valley of Fear (1916)
 Valley of Fire (1951)
 Valley Forge (1975)
 The Valley of Ghosts (1928)
 Valley Girl: (1983 & 2020)
 The Valley of Gwangi (1969)
 The Valley of Hell (1927)
 Valley of Hunted Men (1942)
 Valley of Love (2015)
 Valley of Peace (1956)
 The Valley Resounds (1950)
 Valley of Saints (2012)
 Valley of Shadows (2017)
 The Valley of Silent Men (1922)
 Valley of Song (1953)
 The Valley of Water (1962)
 The Valley of the Bees (1968)
 Valley of the Dolls (1967)
 Valley of the Dragons (1961)
 Valley of the Giants (1938)
 The Valley of the Giants: (1919 & 1927) 
 Valley of the Head Hunters (1953)
 Valley of the Kings (1954)
 Valley of the Moon (1914)
 Valley of the Redwoods (1960)
 Valley of the Sasquatch (2015)
 Valley of the Stereos (1992)
 Valley of the Sun (1942)
 Valley of the Wolves series:
 Valley of the Wolves: Iraq (2006)
 Valley of the Wolves: Gladio (2009)
 Valley of the Wolves: Palestine (2011)
 Valley of the Zombies (1946)
 Valli (1993)
 Valli Vara Pora (1995)
 Valliettan (2000)
 Vallinam (2014)
 Valliyin Selvan (1955)
 Valluvan Vasuki (2008)
 Valmiki: (1946, 1963 Kannada, 1963 Telugu, 2005)
 Valmont (1989)
 Valobasha Emoni Hoy (2017)
 Valparaíso mi amor (1969)
 Valu (2008)
 Valu Jada Tolu Beltu (1992)
 Value—Beyond Price (1910)
 The Value of Ignorance (1989)
 Value for Money (1955)
 Valzer (2007)

Vam

 Vamban (1987)
 Vambu Sandai (2008)
 Vámonos con Pancho Villa (1936)
 Vamp (1986)
 The Vamp (1918)
 Vampariah (2016)
 Vamping (1984)
 Vamping Venus (1928)
 Vampira: (1974 & 1994)
 Vampire: (1979 TV & 2011)
 The Vampire: (1913, 1915 & 1957)
 Vampire Academy (2014)
 Vampire Assassin (2005)
 The Vampire and the Ballerina (1960)
 The Vampire Bat (1933)
 Vampire Bats (2005)
 Vampire Blvd. (2004)
 Vampire in Brooklyn (1995)
 Vampire Circus (1972)
 Vampire Clan (2002)
 Vampire Cleanup Department (2017)
 Vampire Controller (2001)
 Vampire Cop Ricky (2006)
 Vampire Diary (2007)
 Vampire Dog (2012)
 The Vampire Doll (1970)
 The Vampire of Düsseldorf (1965)
 Vampire Girl vs. Frankenstein Girl (2009)
 The Vampire Happening (1971)
 Vampire Hunter D (1985)
 Vampire Hunter D: Bloodlust (2000)
 Vampire Journals (1997)
 Vampire Killers (2009)
 The Vampire Lovers (1970)
 Vampire Moth (1956)
 The Vampire of the Opera (1964)
 Vampire Secrets (2006)
 Vampire Stories: Brothers (2011)
 Vampire vs. Vampire (1989)
 Vampire in Venice (1988)
 The Vampire Who Admires Me (2008)
 The Vampires of Bloody Island (2009)
 The Vampires Night Orgy (1972)
 The Vampire's Ghost (1945)
 Vampire's Kiss (1989)
 Vampirella (1996)
 Vampires (1986)
 Vampires series:
 Vampires (1998)
 Vampires: Los Muertos (2002)
 Vampires: The Turning (2005)
 Les Vampires (1915–16)
 Vampires vs. the Bronx (2020)
 Vampires of Geon (1991–92)
 Vampires in Havana (1985)
 Vampires Suck (2010)
 Vampires of Warsaw (1925)
 Vampires vs. Zombies (2004)
 Vampiro: Angel, Devil, Hero (2008)
 Vamps (2012)
 Vampyr (1932)
 Vampyres (1974)
 Vampyros Lesbos (1971)
 Vamsa Vilakku (1984)
 Vamsa Vruksham (1980)
 Vamsam (2010)
 Vamsha Jyothi (1978)
 Vamsha Vriksha (1972)
 Vamshanikokkadu (1996)
 Vamshi (2008)
 Vamshoddharakudu (2000)
 Vamshodharaka (2015)
 Vamsi (2000)

Van

 The Van: (1977 & 1996)
 Van de koele meren des doods (1982)
 Van Diemen's Land (2009)
 Van Gogh: (1948 & 1991)
 Van Helsing (2004)
 Van Helsing: The London Assignment (2004)
 The Van Nostrand Tiara (1913)
 Van Nuys Blvd. (1979)
 Van Wilder (2002)
 Van Wilder: Freshman Year (2009)
 Van Wilder: The Rise of Taj (2006)
 Vanaja (2006)
 Vanaja Girija (1994)
 Vanakkam Chennai (2013)
 Vanakkam Thalaiva (2005)
 Vanakkam Vathiyare (1991)
 Vanakkatukuriya Kathaliye (1978)
 Vanamagan (2017)
 Vanamala (1951)
 Vanambadi (1963)
 Vanangamudi (1957)
 Vanaprastham (1999)
 Vanaraja Karzan (1938)
 Vanarasena (1996)
 Vanasundari (1951)
 Vanavarayan Vallavarayan (2014)
 Vance and Pepe's Porn Start (2011)
 The Vancouver Asahi (2014)
 Vandae Maatharam (2010)
 Vandana (1975)
 Vandanam (1989)
 Vande Mataram (1985)
 The Vandergilt Diamond Mystery (1936)
 Vandhaale Magaraasi (1973)
 Vandhaan Vendraan (2011)
 Vandhal Sridevi (2018)
 Vandi (2018)
 Vandichakkaram (1980)
 Vandicholai Chinraasu (1994)
 Vandikkari (1974)
 Vandiny trampoty (1938)
 Vanessa: Her Love Story (1935)
 Vangaveeti (2016)
 Vanguard (2020)
 Vani (1943)
 Vani Rani (1974)
 Vanilla and Chocolate (2004)
 Vanilla Sky (2001)
 Vanina Vanini (1961)
 Vanish (2015)
 Vanished: (1995 & 2009)
 The Vanished: (2005 & 2018)
 The Vanished Elephant (2014)
 Vanished – Left Behind: Next Generation (2016)
 The Vanished Murderer (2015)
 A Vanished World (1922)
 The Vanishing: (1988, 1993 & 2019)
 Vanishing on 7th Street (2011)
 The Vanishing Act (TBD)
 Vanishing Africa (1982)
 The Vanishing American: (1925 & 1955)
 Vanishing of the Bees (2009)
 The Vanishing Dagger (1920)
 The Vanishing Duck (1958)
 The Vanishing Frontier (1932)
 The Vanishing Lady (1896)
 Vanishing Men (1932)
 The Vanishing Outpost (1951)
 The Vanishing Pioneer (1928)
 Vanishing Point: (1971, 1997 & 2012)
 The Vanishing Prairie (1954)
 The Vanishing Private (1942)
 The Vanishing Riders (1935)
 The Vanishing Shadow (1934)
 The Vanishing of Sidney Hall (2017)
 Vanishing Time: A Boy Who Returned (2016)
 Vanishing Trails (1920)
 The Vanishing Virginian (1942)
 Vanishing Waves (2012)
 The Vanishing Westerner (1950)
 Vanitha Police (1984)
 Vanity: (1927, 1935, 1947 & 2015)
 Vanity Fair: (1915, 1922, 1923, 1932 & 2004)
 The Vanity Pool (1918)
 The Vanity Serum (2004)
 Vanity's Price (1924)
 Vaniusha and The Giant (1993)
 Vaniusha The Newcomer (1990)
 Vaniusha and The Space Pirate (1991)
 Vanjagan (2006)
 Vanjagar Ulagam (2018)
 Vanjam (1953)
 Vanjikottai Valiban (1958)
 Vanmala (1941)
 Vanmam (2014)
 Vanna Jigina (2015)
 Vanna Kanavugal (1987)
 Vanna Thamizh Pattu (2000)
 Vanna Vanna Pookkal (1992)
 Vannakili (1959)
 Vannu Kandu Keezhadakki (1985)
 The Vanquished (1953)
 Vanquisher (2009)
 Vantage Point (2008)
 Vantha Rajavathaan Varuven (2019)
 Vanya on 42nd Street (1994)

Vap-Vaq

 Vapor (2010)
 Vapors (1965)
 Vaquero (2011)
 The Vaquero's Vow (1908)

Var

 Vara: A Blessing (2013)
 Vara Vikrayam (1939)
 Varadakshina (1977)
 Varadhanayaka (2013)
 Varakatnam (1969)
 Varalaru (2006)
 Varam (1993)
 Varan the Unbelievable (1958)
 Varanmaare Aavashyamundu (1983)
 Varaphalam (1994)
 Varaprasadham (1976)
 Varasudochhadu (1988)
 Varasudu (1993)
 Varat Aali Gharat (2009)
 Varathan (2018)
 Varavelpu (1989)
 Varavu Ettana Selavu Pathana (1994)
 Varavu Nalla Uravu (1990)
 Vardaan (1975)
 Vardhakya Puranam (1994)
 Vardi (1989)
 Vares: Private Eye (2004)
 Vargam (2006)
 Varian's War (2001)
 The Variegateds Case (1958)
 Varietease (1954)
 Varieties on Parade (1951)
 Variety: (1925, 1935, 1971 & 1983)
 Variety Girl (1947)
 Variety Is the Spice of Life (1939)
 Variety Jubilee (1943)
 Variety Lights (1951)
 Variety Parade (1936)
 Variety Time (1948)
 Variola Vera (1982)
 Various Positions (2002)
 The Varmint (1917)
 Varnajalam (2004)
 Varnam: (1989 & 2011)
 Varnapakittu (1997)
 Varning för Jönssonligan (1981)
 Varraar Sandiyar (1995)
 Varsha (2005)
 Varshadhare (2010)
 Varsham: (2004 & 2014)
 Varshangal Poyathariyathe (1987)
 Varsity (1928)
 Varsity Blues (1999)
 Varsity Show (1937)
 Vartak Nagar (2017)
 Vartha (1986)
 Varthamana (2018)
 Varthamana Kalam (1990)
 Vartioitu kylä 1944 (1978)
 Varumayin Niram Sivappu (1980)
 Varusham Padhinaaru (1989)
 Varushamellam Vasantham (2002)
 Varuthapadatha Valibar Sangam (2013)
 Varuvan Vadivelan (1978)

Vas

 Vasandhathil Or Naal (1982)
 Vasantam  (2003)
 Vasantasena (1941)
 Vasantha Geetam (1984)
 Vasantha Geetha (1980)
 Vasantha Lakshmi (1978)
 Vasantha Maligai (1972)
 Vasantha Poornima (1993)
 Vasantha Raagam (1986)
 Vasantha Sena: (1967 & 1985)
 Vasantha Vaasal (1996)
 Vasanthakala Paravai (1991)
 Vasantham Vanthachu (2007)
 Vasanthamalika (2002)
 Vasanthi (1988)
 Vasanthiyum Lakshmiyum Pinne Njaanum (1999)
 Vasantsena (1942)
 Vase de Noces (1974)
 Vasectomy: A Delicate Matter (1986)
 Vaseegara (2003)
 Vashyam (1991)
 Vasika... kalispera sas (1982)
 Vasaliki (1997)
 Vasilisa (2014)
 Vasilisa the Beautiful: (1939 & 1977)
 Vaska Easoff (1996)
 Vasool (2008)
 Vasool Raja MBBS (2004)
 Vassa (1983)
 Vassa Zheleznova (1953)
 The Vast of Night (2019)
 Vastadu Naa Raju (2011)
 Vasthuhara (1991)
 Vastupurush (2002)
 Vasu (2002)
 Vasudha (1992)
 Vasuki (1997)
 Vasundhara (2014)
 Vasuvum Saravananum Onna Padichavanga (2015)
 Vasya (2002)

Vat

 Vattathukkul Chaduram (1978)
 Vatel (2000)
 Vater Morgana (2010)
 Vater sein dagegen sehr (1957)
 Vathikuchi (2013)
 Vathiyar (2006)
 Vathsalya (1965)
 Vathsalya Patha (1980)
 The Vatican Affair (1968)
 Vatican Conspiracy (1982)
 The Vatican Tapes (2015)
 Vatsalyam (1993)
 Vattam (2022)
 Vattaram (2006)

Vau-Vaz

 Vaudhu (1993)
 Vault (2019)
 The Vault (2017)
 The Vault of Horror (1973)
 Vavien (2009)
 Vaxxed: From Cover-Up to Catastrophe (2016)
 Vay Arkadaş (2010)
 Vaya (2016)
 Vaya con Dios (2002)
 Vayal (1981)
 Vayanadan Thamban (1978)
 Vayasu Pasanga (2004)
 Vayasu Pilichindi (1978)
 Vayuputra (2009)
 Vayyari Bhama (1953)
 Vayyari Bhamalu Vagalamari Bhartalu (1982)
 Vazandar (2016)
 Vazante (2017)
 Vazha Pirandhaval (1953)
 Vazhakku Enn 18/9 (2012)
 Vazhi Piranthadu (1964)
 Vazhi Pizhacha Santhathi (1968)
 Vazhivilakku (1976)
 Vazhiyorakazchakal (1987)
 Vazhkai Vazhvatharke (1964)
 Vazhunnor (1999)
 Vazhvile Oru Naal (1956)
 Vazhvey Maayam (1982)
 Vazhvu En Pakkam (1976)

Vc
 Vchera (1988)

Ve

Ved

 Ved (2022)
 Ved kongelunden... (1953)
 Ved verdens ende (2009)
 Veda: (2010 & 2022)
 Vedalam (2015)
 Vedam (2010)
 Vedan (1993)
 Vedappan (2009)
 Vedavathi Alladhu Seetha Jananam (1941)
 Vedha (2008)
 Vedhala Ulagam (1948)
 Vedham (2001)
 Vedham Pudhithu (1987)
 Vedi (2011)
 Vedigundu Murugesan (2009)
 Vedigundu Pasangge (2018)
 Vedikkai En Vadikkai (1990)
 Vedikkettu (1980)
 Vedivazhipadu (2013)

Vee

 Vee Beyvafa (2016)
 Veede (2003)
 Veedevadandi Babu (1997)
 Veedevadu (2017)
 Veedhi (2006)
 Veedu (1988)
 Veedu Manaivi Makkal (1988)
 Veedu Oru Swargam (1977)
 Veedu Theda (2011)
 Veendum (1986)
 Veendum Chalikkunna Chakram (1984)
 Veendum Chila Veettukaryangal (1999)
 Veendum Kannur (2012)
 Veendum Lisa (1987)
 Veendum Prabhatham (1973)
 Veer: (1995 & 2010)
 Veer! (2012)
 Veer Ghatotkach (1949)
 Veer Hamirji – Somnath ni Sakhate (2012)
 Veer Kunal (1945)
 Veer Savarkar (2001)
 Veer Tejaji (1982)
 Veer-Zaara (2004)
 Veera: (1994, 2011, 2013 & 2018)
 Veera Bahu (2011)
 Veera Bhoga Vasantha Rayalu (2018)
 Veera Jagathis (1938)
 Veera Kankanam (1957)
 Veera Kannadiga (2004)
 Veera Kesari (1963)
 Veera Madakari (2009)
 Veera Padhakkam (1994)
 Veera Parampare (2010)
 Veera Puran Appu (1978)
 Veera Ramani (1939)
 Veera Sankalpa (1964)
 Veera Sindhoora Lakshmana (1977)
 Veera Sivaji (2016)
 Veera Telangana (2010)
 Veera Thalattu (1998)
 Veeraana (2010)
 Veerabhadra (2006)
 Veerabhadran (1979)
 Veerabhimanyu (1965)
 Veeradhi Veera (1985)
 Veerakkanal (1960)
 Veeram Vilanja Mannu (1998)
 Veeramani (1994)
 Veeramum Eeramum (2007)
 Veetula Raman Veliyila Krishnan (1983)

Veg–Vek

 Vegam: (2007 & 2014)
 Vegas, City of Dreams (2001)
 Vegas In Space (1993)
 The Vegas Strip War (1984)
 Vegas Vacation (1997)
 Vegetarian (2010)
 Vegetarian Cannibal (2012)
 Vegucated (2011)
 Vehey Vaarey Therein (2005)
 Vehicle 19 (2013)
 The Veil: (2016 & 2017)
 The Veil Dancer (1929)
 The Veil of Twilight (2014)
 The Veiled Adventure (1919)
 Veiled Aristocrats (1932)
 The Veiled Woman (1929)
 The Veils of Bagdad (1953)
 The Vein (1928)
 Veinte pasos para la muerte (1970)
 Vekh Baraatan Challiyan (2017)
 Vektor (2010)

Vel–Vem

 Vel (2007)
 Velai (1998)
 Velai Kidaichuduchu (1990)
 Velaiilla Pattadhari (2014)
 Velaiilla Pattadhari 2 (2017)
 Velaikaran (1952)
 Velaikkaran: (1987 & 2017)
 Velainu Vandhutta Vellaikaaran (2016)
 Velakkaran (1953)
 Velayudham (2011)
 The Veldt (1987)
 Velicham Vitharunna Penkutty (1982)
 Velichamillatha Veedhi (1984)
 Veliko suđenje (1961)
 Velipadinte Pusthakam (2017)
 Vellai Pookal (2019)
 Vellai Roja (1983)
 Vellaikaara Durai (2014)
 Vellakkuppayam (2014)
 Vellaiya Irukiravan Poi Solla Maatan (2015)
 Vellaiya Thevan (1990)
 Vellam (1985)
 Vellanakalude Nadu (1988)
 Vellarikka Pattanam (1985)
 Vellaripravinte Changathi (2011)
 Vellathooval (2009)
 Vellayani Paramu (1979)
 Velli Thirai (2008)
 Velli Vizha (1972)
 Vellikizhamai Viratham (1974)
 Vellimoonga (2014)
 Vellinakshatram: (1949 & 2004)
 Vellithira (2003)
 Vellivelichathil (2014)
 Velliyazhcha (1969)
 Vellore Maavattam (2010)
 Velluvili (1978)
 Le Vélo de Ghislain Lambert (2001)
 The VelociPastor (2018)
 The Velocity of Gary (1999)
 Velocity Trap (1999)
 Veluchami (1995)
 Velugu Needalu (1961)
 Velum Mayilum Thunai (1979)
 Velundu Vinaiyillai (1987)
 Velutha Kathreena (1968)
 Veluthambi Dalawa (1962)
 Veluthu Kattu (2010)
 Velvet Buzzsaw (2019)
 Velvet Goldmine (1998)
 The Velvet Paw (1916)
 Velvet Smooth (1976)
 The Velvet Touch (1948)
 The Velvet Underground (2021)
 The Velvet Underground and Nico: A Symphony of Sound (1966)
 The Velvet Vampire (1971)
 Velvi (2008)
 Vembanad (1991)
 Vemulawada Bheemakavi (1976)

Ven

 Ven mi corazón te llama (1942)
 Ven Shankhu Pol (2011)
 Venal (1981)
 Venal Kinavukal (1991)
 Venalil Oru Mazha (1979)
 Vendetta: (1919, 1950, 1986, 1995, 1999, 2013, 2015, 2017 & 2022)
 Vendetta dal futuro (1986)
 Vendetta di zingara (1950)
 Vendetta for a Samurai (1952)
 Vendetta for the Saint (1969 TV)
 Vendetta... sarda (1951)
 The Vendor (2018)
 Vendredi soir (2002)
 Veneno para las hadas (1984)
 The Venerable Ones (1962)
 Veneri al sole (1965)
 The Venetian (1958)
 The Venetian Affair (1967)
 Venetian Bird (1952)
 Venetian Honeymoon (1959)
 Venetian Lovers (1925)
 Venetian Nights (1931)
 The Venetian Woman (1986)
 Vengeance: (1930, 1958, 1968, 1970, 2009, 2014 & 2022)
 Vengeance of an Assassin (2014)
 Vengeance of the Dead (1917)
 Vengeance of the Deep (1923)
 Vengeance Is a Dish Served Cold (1971)
 The Vengeance of Fu Manchu (1967)
 The Vengeance of Galora (1913)
 Vengeance Is Mine: (1916, 1917, 1935, 1949, 1968 & 1979)
 Vengeance Is My Forgiveness (1968)
 The Vengeance of Jago (1912) 
 The Vengeance of Pancho Villa (1967)
 Vengeance of Rannah (1936)
 The Vengeance of She (1968)
 The Vengeance of Ursus (1961)
 Vengeance Valley (1951)
 Vengeance of the Vikings (1965)
 The Vengeance of the Winged Serpent (1984)
 Vengeance of the Zombies (1973)
 Vengeance: A Love Story (2017)
 Vengeful Beauty (1978)
 Vengeful Heart (2014)
 Vengo (2000)
 Venice (2014)
 Venice Bound (1995)
 Venice Medical (1983)
 The Venice Project (1999)
 Venice/Venice (1992)
 Venkatadri Express (2013)
 Venkatapuram (2017)
 Venom (1971)
 Venom (1981)
 Venom (2005)
Venom series:
Venom: Truth in Journalism (2013, short)
Venom (2018)
Venom: Let There Be Carnage (2021)
 Venomous (2001)
 Le vent de la nuit (1999)
 Venture of Faith (1951)
 Venus: (2006 & 2017)
 Venus in the East (1919)
 Venus Flytrap (1970)
 Venus in Fur (2013)
 Venus in Furs (1969)
 Venus Makes Trouble (1937)
 Venus and Mars: (2001 & 2007)
 The Venus Model (1918)
 The Venus of Montmartre (1925)
 Venus Peter (1989)
 Venus Rising (1995)
 Venus and Serena (2012)
 Venus and the Sun (2011)
 Venus of Venice (1927)
 Venus Wars (1989)
 Venussian Tabutasco (2004)

Vep

 Veppam (2011)
 Vepraalam (1984)

Ver

 Vera Cruz (1954)
 Vera Drake (2004)
 Verax (2013)
 Verbena Tragica (1939)
 Verboten! (1959)
 Verdens Undergang (1916)
 Verdi, the King of Melody (1953)
 Verdict (1974)
 The Verdict: (1946, 1959, 1982 & 2013)
 The Verdict of the Heart (1915)
 The Verdict of Lake Balaton (1933)
 Verdict of the Sea (1932)
 Vere Vazhi Ille (2015)
 Veritas, Prince of Truth (2007)
 The Vermilion Pencil (1922)
 Vermont Is for Lovers (1992)
 Verna (2017)
 Verna: USO Girl (1978)
 Vernon, Florida (1981)
 The Verona Trial (1963)
 Veronica Guerin (2003)
 Veronica Mars  (2014)
 Veronica's Wish (2018)
 Veronika Decides to Die (2012)
 Veronika Voss (1982)
 The Versace Murder (1998)
 The Verse of Us (2015)
 Versus: (2000 & 2016)
 Vertical Limit (2000)
 Vertical Ray of the Sun (2000)
 Vertigo (1958)
 Very Annie Mary (2001)
 Very Bad Things (1998)
 The Very Best Day (2015)
 A Very Brady Christmas (1988 TV)
 A Very Brady Sequel (1996)
 A Very British Cover-up (2009)
 A Very Christmas Story (2000)
 Very Confidential (1927)
 A Very Curious Girl (1969)
 The Very Edge (1963)
 A Very English Murder (1974)
 The Very Excellent Mr. Dundee (2020)
 Very Good Girls (2013)
 A Very Good Young Man (1919)
 A Very Harold & Kumar 3D Christmas (2011)
 A Very Honorable Guy (1934)
 The Very Idea (1929)
 Very Important Person (1961)
 The Very Late Afternoon of a Faun (1983)
 A Very Long Engagement (2004)
 Very Mean Men (2000)
 A Very Merry Daughter of the Bride (2008)
 A Very Merry Mix-Up (2013)
 A Very Merry Pooh Year (2002)
 The Very Merry Widows (2003)
 A Very Moral Night (1977)
 A Very Murray Christmas (2015)
 A Very Natural Thing (1974)
 Very Nice, Very Nice (1961)
 A Very Private Affair (1962)
 The Very Private Life of Mister Sim (2015)
 The Very Same Munchhausen (1979)
 A Very Serious Person (2006)
 A Very Short Life (2009)
 A Very Special Favor (1965)
 A Very Special Love series:
 A Very Special Love (2008)
 You Changed My Life (2009)
 It Takes a Man and a Woman (2013)
 The Very Thought of You: (1944 & 1998)
 A Very Unlucky Leprechaun (1998)
 Very Young Girls (2007)
 A Very Young Lady (1941)

Ves–Vez

 Veselá bída (1944)
 Veseto and the black and white happiness (2009)
 Vesham (2004)
 Vesna (1953)
 Vesper (2022)
 Vessel (2014)
 The Vessel (2016)
 Vessel of Wrath (1938)
 The Vesuvians (1997)
 Veta (2014)
 Vetagaadu (1979)
 Veteran (2015)
 The Veteran: (2006 & 2011)
 The Veteran of Waterloo  (1933)
 The Veterinarian's Adopted Children (1968)
 Vetri (1984)
 Vetri Karangal (1991)
 Vetri Kodi Kattu (2000)
 Vetri Padigal (1991)
 Vetri Selvan (2014)
 Vetri Vinayagar (1996)
 Vetri Vizha (1989)
 Vetrikku Oruvan (1979)
 Vetrivel Sakthivel (2005)
 Vetta (1984)
 Vettah (2016)
 Vettai (2012)
 Vettaikaaran: (1964 & 2009)
 Vettaiyaadu Vilaiyaadu (2006)
 Vettam (2004)
 Vettu Onnu Thundu Rendu (1998)
 Veve (2014)
 Veyil: (2006 & 2022)
 Veyilmarangal (2019)
 Vezhambal (1977)

Vi

 Vi arme syndere (1952)
 Vi bygger landet (1936)
 Vi er allesammen tossede (1959)
 Vi flyr på Rio (1949)
 Vi gifter oss (1951)
 Vi hade i alla fall tur med vädret (1980 TV)
 Vi hade i alla fall tur med vädret – igen (2008)
 Vi har det jo dejligt (1963)
 Vi of Smith's Alley (1921)
 Vi som går kjøkkenveien (1933)
 Vi vil leve (1946)
 Vi vil oss et land... (1936)
 Vi vil skilles (1952)

Via–Vib

 Via Darjeeling (2008)
 Via degli specchi (1982)
 Via Mala: (1945 & 1961)
 Via Montenapoleone (1986)
 Le Viager (1972)
 Viaggi di nozze (1995)
 Viaggio sentimentale a Roma (1951)
 Viaje (2015)
 Viaje a la luna (1958)
 Viaje de una noche de verano (1965)
 Viaje sin regreso (1946)
 Un Viaje al más allá (1963)
 Un viaje con Fidel (2015)
 Viajera (1952)
 Viale della canzone (1965)
 Vibes (1988)
 Vibrations (1996)
 Vibrator (2003)

Vic

 Vic (2006)
 Vic and Flo Saw a Bear (2013)
 The Vicar of Bray (1937)
 The Vicar of Vejlby: (1922 & 1931)
 The Vicar of Wakefield: (1910, 1913, 1916 & 1917)
 Vice: (2007, 2008, 2015 & 2018)
 The Vice (1915)
 Vice Academy series:
 Vice Academy (1989)
 Vice Academy 2 (1990)
 Vice Academy 3 (1991)
 Vice Academy 4 (1995)
 Vice Academy 5 (1996)
 Vice Academy 6 (1998)
 The Vice of Gambling (1923)
 Vice Girls (1996)
 The Vice of Hope (2018)
 The Vice of Humanity (1927)
 Vice Raid (1960)
 Vice Squad: (1953, 1978 & 1982)
 The Vice Squad (1931)
 Vice Versa: (1916, 1948 & 1988)
 Vice and Virtue (1963)
 Viceroy's House (2017)
 Vichithram (2022)
 Vichitra Bandham (1972)
 Vichitra Jeevitham (1978)
 Vichitra Kutumbam (1969)
 Vichitra Prema (1991)
 Vichitra Vanitha (1947)
 Vicious Circle: (1999 & 2008)
 The Vicious Circle: (1948 & 1957)
 Vicious Fun (2020)
 The Vicious Kind (2009)
 The Vicious Years (1950)
 Vicki (1953)
 Vicky Cristina Barcelona (2008)
 Le Vicomte de Bragelonne (1954)
 Victim: (1961, 1999 & 2011)
 The Victim: (1916, 1980, 2006, 2011 & 2012)
 Victim of the Brain (1988)
 Victim of Desire (1995)
 Victim Five (1964)
 Victim of Love (1991)
 A Victim of the Mormons (1911)
 Victims (1982)
 Victims of Passion (1922)
 Victims of Vice (1978)
 Victims for Victims: The Theresa Saldana Story (1984)
 Victor: (1951, 1993, 2008 & 2009)
 The Victor (1932)
 Victor and Victoria: (1933 & 1957)
 Victor Crowley (2017)
 Victor Frankenstein (2015)
 Victor/Victoria: (1982 & 1995 TV)
 Victoria: (1935, 1972, 1979, 2008, 2013 & 2015)
 Victoria & Abdul (2017)
 The Victoria Cross (1916)
 The Victoria Cross: For Valour (2003)
 Victoria Day (2009)
 Victoria in Dover: (1936 & 1954)
 Victoria the Great (1937)
 Victoria and Her Hussar: (1931 & 1954)
 Victoria No. 203: (1972 & 2007)
 Victorious Return (1947)
 The Victors: (1918 & 1963)
 Victory: (1919, 1928, 1938, 1940, 1976, 1996, 2008, 2009 & 2013)
 Victory 2 (2018)
 The Victory of Conscience (1916)
 The Victory of Faith (1933)
 Victory Is Mine (1956)
 The Victory Leaders (1919)
 Victory March (1976)
 Victory and Peace (1918)
 The Victory Sun (1953)
 Victory Through Air Power (1943)
 Victory's Short (2014)

Vid

 Vida de Menina (2004)
 Vida y milagros de Don Fausto (1924)
 Vida nocturna (1955)
 Vidaaya (2015)
 Vidar the Vampire (2017)
 Vidarunna Mottukal (1977)
 Vidas marcadas (1942)
 Vidas Secas (1963)
 Vidayutham (2016)
 Video Clip (2007)
 Video Days (1991)
 Video Dead (1987)
 Video Demons Do Psychotown (1989)
 Video de Familia (2001)
 Video Fool for Love (1996)
 Video Games: The Movie (2014)
 Video Nasties: Moral Panic, Censorship & Videotape (2010)
 Video Violence (1987)
 Video Vixens (1975)
 Video Voyeur (2002)
 Videocracy (2009)
 Videodrome (1983)
 Videograms of a Revolution (1992)
 Videophilia (and Other Viral Syndromes) (2015)
 Videsi Nair Swadesi Nair (2002)
 Vidhaata (1982)
 Vidheyan (1993)
 Vidhi Madhi Ultaa (2018)
 Vidhi Thanna Vilakku (1962)
 Vidhi Vilasa (1962)
 Vidhichathum Kothichathum (1982)
 Vidhivilasa (1962)
 Vidhu (2010)
 Vidhyarambham (1990)
 Vidhyarthikale Ithile Ithile (1972)
 Vidinja Kalyanam (1986)
 Vidiyum Munn (2013)
 Vidiyum Varai Kaathiru (1981)
 Vidocq: (1939 & 2001)
 Vidukathai (1997)
 Viduthalai: (1954, 1986 & TBD)
 Vidya (1948)
 Vidyapathi (1946)
 Vidyapati (1937)
 Vidyardhi (2004)
 Vidyarthi (1968)

Vie

 La vie en rose (2007)
 Vie et Passion du Christ (1903)
 Viejo smoking (1930)
 Viejos amigos (2014)
 Viel Lärm um nichts (1964)
 Viena and the Fantomes (2020)
 Vieni avanti cretino (1982)
 Vienna (1968)
 Vienna 1910 (1943)
 Vienna Blood (1942)
 Vienna, City of My Dreams: (1928 & 1957)
 Vienna, City of Song: (1923 & 1930)
 Vienna, How it Cries and Laughs (1926)
 Vienna Tales (1940)
 Vienna Waltzes (1951)
 Viennese Girls (1945)
 Viennese Nights (1930)
 Viennese Waltz (1932)
 Viento salvaje (1974)
 Vier gegen die Bank: (1976 & 2016)
 Vier Jongens en een Jeep (1955)
 Vietato ai minori (1992)
 Vietnam Colony: (1992 & 1994)
 Vietnam, Long Time Coming (1998)
 Vietnam Nurses (2005)
 Vietnam: The Last Battle (1995)
 Vietnam Veedu (1970)
 Vietnam! Vietnam! (1971)
 Vietnam War Story II (1988)
 Vieuphoria (1994)
 Le vieux fusil (1975)
 A View from the Bridge (1962)
 A View from Eiffel Tower (2005)
 A View from a Hill (2005 TV)
 A View to a Kill (1985)
 A View of Love (2010)
 The View from Pompey's Head (1955)
 View from the Top (2003)
 The Viewing Booth (2019)

Vig–Vik

 Vigathakumaran (1930)
 Vigil (1984)
 The Vigil: (1914, 1998 & 2019)
 Vigil in the Night (1940)
 Vigilante (1982)
 Vigilante 3D (2013)
 A Vigilante (2018)
 The Vigilante (1947)
 Vigilante Diaries (2016)
 Vigilante Force (1976)
 Vigilante Hideout (1950)
 Vigilante Terror (1953)
 Vigilante Vigilante: The Battle for Expression (2011)
 The Vigilantes Are Coming (1936)
 Vigilantes of Boomtown (1947)
 Vigilantes of Dodge City (1944)
 The Vigilantes Return (1947)
 The Vigilantes Ride (1943)
 Vigilantes y ladrones (1952)
 Vigour (1990) 
 Vihir (2009)
 Viimne reliikvia (1969)
 Vijay: (1942, 1988 & 1989)
 Vijay and I (2013)
 Vijay Lakshmi (1943)
 Vijay Superum Pournamiyum (2019)
 Vijay Vikram (1979)
 Vijaya Gauri (1955)
 Vijaya Kuweni (2012)
 Vijayaba Kollaya (2019)
 Vijayadasami (2007)
 Vijayakumari (1950)
 Vijayalakshmi (1946)
 Vijayam Manade (1970)
 Vijayam Nammude Senani (1979)
 Vijayanagarada Veeraputhra (1961)
 Vijayanum Veeranum (1979)
 Vijayapuri Veeran (1960)
 Vijayaramaraju (2000)
 Vijayendra Varma (2004)
 Vijaypath (1994)
 Vijeta: (1982 & 1996)
 Vijetha (1985)
 Vijetha Vikram (1987)
 Vijftig jaren (1948)
 Vikadakavi (2011)
 Vikadakumaran (2018)
 Vikadan (2003)
 Vikaljarek (2016)
 Vikatakavi (1984)
 Vikatayogi (1946)
 Viking (2016)
 The Viking: (1928 & 1931)
 The Viking Queen (1967)
 A Viking Saga (2008)
 The Viking Sagas (1995)
 The Viking Watch of the Danish Seaman (1948)
 Vikingdom (2013)
 The Vikings (1958)
 Vikram: (1986 Tamil & 1986 Telugu)
 Vikram Vedha (2017)
 Vikram Vetal (1986)
 Vikrama Urvashi (1940)
 Vikramaadhithan (1962)
 Vikramadithyan (2014)
 Vikramaditya (1945)
 Vikramarkudu (2006)
 Viktor (2014)
 Viktor Vogel – Commercial Man (2001)
 Viktoria (2014)

Vil–Vim

 The Vila Family (1950)
 Vile (2011)
 Vileness Fats (unfinished)
 Villa!! (1958)
 Villa Estrella (2009)
 A Villa in Los Angeles (2013)
 Villa Rides (1968)
 The Villa in Tiergarten Park (1927)
 Villa Zone (1975)
 The Village: (1953, 2004 & 2015)
 A Village Affair (1995)
 The Village Barbershop (2008)
 Village Barn Dance (1940)
 The Village Blacksmith: (1917 & 1922)
 Village of the Damned: (1960 & 1995)
 Village of Daughters (1962)
 Village Detective (1969)
 The Village Doctor (1951)
 Village of the Giants (1965)
 Village of Idiots (1999)
 The Village of Love (1950)
 The Village 'Neath the Sea (1914)
 The Village of No Return (2017)
 The Village Priest (1927)
 The Village on the River (1958)
 The Village Rogue (1916)
 A Village Scandal (1915)
 The Village Sleuth (1920)
 The Village Squire (1935)
 Village Tale (1935)
 The Village Teacher (1947)
 The Village Under the Sky (1953)
 Village Wooing (1962)
 The Villagers (2018)
 Villain: (1971 & 2002)
 The Villain: (1917, 1979, 2009 & 2018)
 The Villain Foiled (1911)
 The Villain Still Pursued Her (1940)
 The Villainess (2017)
 Villains (2019)
 The Villiers Diamond (1938)
 Vimaanam (2017)
 Vimala (1960)
 Vimochanam (1939)
 Vimochanasamaram (1971)
 Vimukthi (2010)

Vin

 Vinaya Vidheya Rama (2019)
 Vinayaka Geleyara Balaga (2011)
 Vinayakudu (2008)
 Vinayapoorvam Vidhyaadharan (2000)
 Vince and Kath and James (2016)
 Vincent: (1982 & 1987)
 Vincent, François, Paul and the Others (1974)
 Vincent and Me (1990)
 Vincent N Roxxy (2016)
 Vincent & Theo (1990)
 Vincent Wants to Sea (2010)
 Vincent Who? (2009)
 Vinci (2004)
 Vinci Da (2019)
 Vinden blåser vart den vill (2017)
 Vindhyarani (1948)
 Vindication (2008)
 The Vindicator (1986)
 Vineta, the Sunken City (1923)
 The Vineyard (1989)
 A Vingança de uma Mulher (2012)
 Vinmeengal (2012)
 Vinnaithaandi Varuvaayaa (2010)
 Vinnukum Mannukum (2001)
 Vinobraní (1982)
 Vinodam (1996)
 Vinodayathra (2007)
 The Vintage (1957)
 Vintage Wine (1935)
 Vinterland (2007)
 Vinyan (2008)
 Vinyl: (1965, 2000 & 2012)

Vio–Vip

 Le Viol du Vampire (1968)
 Violated (1996)
 Violated Paradise (1963)
 Violation (2020)
 Violator (2014)
 The Violators (1957)
 Violence: (1947 & 1955)
 Violence in a Women's Prison (1982)
 Violent Blue (2011)
 The Violent Enemy (1968)
 The Violent Heart (2020)
 Violent Is the Word for Curly (1938)
 The Violent Kind (2010)
 Violent Life (1961)
 A Violent Life (1990)
 The Violent Men (1955)
 Violent Midnight (1963)
 Violent Moment (1959)
 Violent Naples (1976)
 Violent Night (2022)
 The Violent Ones (1967)
 The Violent Patriot (1956)
 Violent Playground (1958)
 The Violent Professionals (1973)
 A Violent Prosecutor (2016)
 Violent Road (1958)
 Violent Rome (1975)
 Violent Saturday (1955)
 A Violent Separation (2019)
 The Violent Years (1956)
 Violet: (1921, 1978, 1981 & 2021)
 Violet & Daisy (2013)
 The Violet Eater (1926)
 The Violet of Potsdamer Platz (1936)
 The Violet Seller (1958)
 Violet Tendencies (2010)
 Violets Are Blue (1986)
 Violette Nozière (1978)
 Violin (2011)
 Violin (2017)
 The Violin (2005)
 The Violin King (1923)
 The Violin Maker (1915)
 The Violin Maker of Cremona (1909)
 The Violin Maker of Mittenwald (1950)
 The Violin of Monsieur (1914)
 The Violin Player (1994)
 Viper (2001)
 The Viper (1938)
 Viper Club (2018)
 Vipers (2008)
 Viplavakarikal (1968)

Vir

 Virados do Avesso (2014)
 Viral: (2016 American & 2016 Hindi)
 The Viral Factor (2012)
 Virgin (2003)
 The Virgin (1924)
 A Virgin Among the Living Dead (1973)
 The Virgin, the Copts and Me (2011)
 The Virgin and the Gypsy (1970)
 Virgin Island (1958)
 Virgin Lips (1928)
 The Virgin of Lust (2002)
 The Virgin and the Macho Man (1974)
 The Virgin Man (1956)
 The Virgin Mart (1974)
 The Virgin of Nuremberg (1963)
 A Virgin Paradise (1921)
 The Virgin Psychics (2015)
 The Virgin Queen: (1923 & 1955)
 The Virgin Queen of St. Francis High (1987)
 The Virgin of the Seminole (1922)
 The Virgin Soldiers (1969)
 The Virgin Spring (1960)
 The Virgin of Stamboul (1920)
 Virgin Stripped Bare by Her Bachelors (2000)
 The Virgin Suicides (1999)
 Virgin Territory (2007)
 The Virgin Wife (1958)
 Virgin Witch (1971)
 Virginia: (1941 & 2010)
 Virginia City (1940)
 A Virginia Courtship (1921)
 Virginia Creepers (2009)
 The Virginia Judge (1935)
 A Virginia Romance (1916)
 Virginia's Husband: (1928 & 1934)
 Virginia's Run (2002)
 The Virginian: (1914, 1923, 1929 & 1946)
 The Virginity Hit (2010)
 The Virgins (2016)
 Virgins of the Seven Seas (1974)
 The Virgo, the Taurus and the Capricorn (1977)
 Viridiana (1961)
 Virtual Desire (1995)
 Virtual JFK (2008)
 Virtual Nightmare (2000 TV)
 Virtual Obsession (1998 TV)
 Virtual Seduction (1995 TV)
 Virtual Sexuality (1999)
 Virtually Heroes (2013)
 Virtue (1932)
 Virtuosity (1995)
 The Virtuoso (2021)
 Virtuous (2014)
 The Virtuous Bigamist (1956)
 The Virtuous Husband (1931)
 The Virtuous Model (1919)
 The Virtuous Scoundrel (1953)
 The Virtuous Sin (1930)
 The Virtuous Sinner (1931)
 The Virtuous Thief (1919)
 A Virtuous Vamp (1919)
 Viruddh... Family Comes First (2005)
 Virumaandi (2004)
 Virunga (2014)
 Virus: (1980, 1995, 1999 & 2007)
 Virus Undead (2008)

Vis

 La Visa Loca (2005)
 Visas and Virtue (1997)
 The Viscount of Monte Cristo (1954)
 Vishwa Thulasi (2004)
 The Vision (1988 TV)
 Vision Quest (1985)
 The Vision of Paolo Soleri: Prophet in the Desert (2013)
 The Visionaries (1968)
 Visioneers (2008)
 Visions (2015)
 Visions of Death (1972)
 Visions of Ecstasy (1989)
 Visions of Eight (1973)
 Visions of Light (1992)
 Visions of Murder (1993)
 A Visit (2018)
 The Visit: (1964, 2000, 2015 America & 2015 Nigeria)
 Visit to a Chief's Son (1974)
 Visit to Minotaur (1987 TV)
 Visit to Picasso (1949)
 A Visit to Santa (1963)
 A Visit to the Seaside (1908)
 Visit to a Small Planet (1960)
 The Visitation (2006)
 Les Visiteurs du Soir (1942)
 Visiting Hours (1982)
 The Visitor: (1974, 1979, 2002, 2007 short, 2007 drama, 2008 & 2015)
 A Visitor to a Museum (1989)
 Visitor Q (2001)
 Visitors: (2003 & 2013)
 The Visitors: (1972 & 1993) 
 The Visitors II: The Corridors of Time (1998)
 The Visitors: Bastille Day (2016)
 Visual Acoustics: The Modernism of Julius Shulman (2008)
 The Visual Bible: Acts (1994)
 The Visual Bible: Matthew (1993)

Vit–Viz

 Vita coi figli (1990)
 Vita & Virginia (2018)
 Vital (2004)
 Vital Signs: (1990 & 2009)
 Vitalina Varela (2019)
 Vito (2011)
 Vitthala Shappath (2017)
 Vitti Dandu (2014)
 Vitus (2006)
 Vitya Glushakov - A Friend of the Apaches (1983) 
 Una Viuda descocada (1980)
 Una viuda difícil (1957)
 Viuuulentemente mia (1982)
 A Viuvinha (1914)
 Viva (2007)
 Viva Belarus! (2012)
 Viva Buddy (1934)
 Viva Cangaceiro (1970)
 Viva Cisco Kid (1940)
 Viva Cuba (2005)
 Viva Cuba Lib: Rap is War (2014)
 Viva Erotica (1996)
 Viva Freedom! (1946)
 Viva Knievel! (1977)
 Viva Las Vegas (1964)
 Viva Maria! (1965)
 Viva Max! (1969)
 Viva la Muerte (1971)
 Viva Spider-Man (1980)
 Viva la vie (1984)
 Viva Villa! (1934)
 Viva Zapata! (1952)
 Vivacious Lady (1938)
 Vivah: (2006 & 2019)
 Vivaha Bandham (1964)
 Vivaha Bhojanambu: (1988 & 2021)
 Vivaham Swargathil (1970)
 Vivahasammanam (1971)
 Vivahitha (1970)
 Vivaramana Aalu (2002)
 Vivarium (2019)
 Vivasaayi Magan (1997)
 Vivasayee (1967)
 Vive la France (2013)
 Vive la France! (1918)
 Vive L'Amour (1994)
 Vive le Tour (1962)
 The Vivero Letter (1998)
 Viviana (1916)
 Viviette (1918)
 Vivre sa Vie (1962)
 Vivo (2021)
 The Vixen (1916)
 Vixen! (1968)
 The Vixens of Kung Fu (1975)
 Viy: (1909, 1967 & 2014)
 Viy 2: Journey to China (2019)
 Viyabari (2007)
 Viyapath Bambara (2010)
 Viyarppinte Vila (1962)
 Viyyalavari Kayyalu (2007)
 Vizhi Moodi Yosithaal (2014)
 Vizhithiru (2017)
 Vizontele (2001)
 Vizontele Tuuba (2004)

Vl

Vlad (2003)
Vlad Țepeș (1979)
Vlčí jáma (1957)
Vlees (2010)
Vlogger (2011)

Vo

Voc–Voi

 Voces inocentes (2004)
 Vodka Diaries (2018)
 Vodka Lemon (2013)
 Vodkaa, komisario Palmu (1969)
 Una voglia da morire (1965)
 Voglia di donna (1978)
 Voglia di guardare (1986)
 Voglia di vivere (1990)
 Vogue la galère (1973)
 Voi meitä! Anoppi tulee (1933)
 Voice (2005)
 The Voice: (1920, 1966, 1982, 1992 & 2010)
 The Voice of Action (1942)
 The Voice of Bugle Ann (1936)
 The Voice of the Child (1911)
 Voice of the City (1929)
 The Voice of Conscience: (1912, 1917 & 1920)
 A Voice from the Dark (1921)
 A Voice from the Deep (1912) 
 The Voice in the Fog (1916)
 Voice from the Grave (1996)
 The Voice of Happiness (1931)
 The Voice of the Heart: (1924 & 1937)
 The Voice of Love  (1934)
 The Voice of Merrill (1952)
 The Voice from the Minaret (1923)
 Voice in the Mirror (1958)
 The Voice of the Moon (1990)
 Voice of a Murderer (2007)
 The Voice of My City (1953)
 Voice of My Father (2012)
 Voice in the Night (1934)
 Voice Over (2014)
 The Voice of Passion (1913)
 A Voice Said Goodnight (1932)
 Voice of Silence: (1953 & 2013)
 The Voice from the Sky (1930)
 Voice from the Stone (2017)
 The Voice of the Turtle (1947)
 The Voice of the Violin (1909)
 The Voice of the Voiceless (2013)
 The Voice of Warning (1912)
 Voice of the Whistler (1945)
 The Voice in the Wilderness (1991)
 Voice in the Wind (1944)
 The Voice Within (1946)
 Voice Without a Shadow  (1958)
 Voices: (1973 & 1979)
 The Voices (2014)
 Voices of Bam (2006)
 Voices from Beyond (1991)
 Voices from Chernobyl (2016)
 Voices of the Children (1999)
 Voices of the City (1921)
 Voices of Desire (1972) 
 Voices of Iraq (2004)
 Voices of Kidnapping (2017)
 Voices in the Night (2003)
 Voices of Sarafina! (1988)
 Voices of Spring: (1933 & 1952)
 Voices of Transition (2012)
 Voices in the Tunnels (2008)
 Voiceless (2016)
 Voices: (1973, 1979 & 2007)
 Void  (2013)
 The Void: (2001 & 2016)
 Voir la mer (2011)

Voj–Vor

 Vojtech, Called the Orphan (1990)
 Vol-au-vent (1996)
 Volando bajo (2014)
 Volavérunt (1999)
 Le Volcan interdit (1966)
 Volcano: (1942, 1950, 1997 & 2011)
 Volcano! (1926)
 The Volcano Disaster (2005)
 Volcano High (2001)
 Volcano: An Inquiry into the Life and Death of Malcolm Lowry (1976)
 Volcano: Fire on the Mountain (1997)
 Volcanoes of the Deep Sea (2003)
 Voldemort: Origins of the Heir (2018)
 Volevo i pantaloni (1990)
 The Volga Boatman (1926)
 Volga Volga (1928)
 Volga-Volga (1938)
 Volhynia (2016)
 Volley (2015)
 Volta (2004)
 A Volta do Filho Pródigo (1978)
 Voltaire (1933)
 La Voltige (1895)
 Voltron: The End (2011)
 Volume (2012)
 Volumes of Blood (2015)
 Volumes of Blood: Horror Stories (2016)
 The Volunteer: (1917 & 1943)
 Volunteers (1985)
 Volver (2006)
 Vom mutigen Hans (1959)
 Von nun ab, Herr Kunze (1956)
 Von Richthofen and Brown (1971)
 Von Ryan's Express (1965)
 The von Trapp Family: A Life of Music (2015)
 Voodoo (1995)
 Voodoo Academy (2000)
 Voodoo Dawn (1990)
 Voodoo Dollz (2008)
 Voodoo Island (1957)
 Voodoo Man (1944)
 Voodoo Moon (2006)
 Voodoo Tiger (1952)
 Voodoo Woman (1957)
 Voor een paar knikkers meer (2006)
 Voorbeschikten (1920)
 The Voorman Problem (2013)
 Voroshilov Shapeshifter (1999)
 Vortex: (1976, 1981, 2009 & 2021)
 The Vortex (1928)
 Vortex, the Face of Medusa (1967)

Vot–Voz

 Vote for Change? 2004 (2008)
 Vote for Huggett (1949)
 A Vote for the King of the Romans (2016 TV)
 The Vote That Counted (1911)
 Voter (2019)
 Votes for Women (1912)
 Votez Bougon (2016)
 Voto di castità (1976)
 Voulez-vous coucher avec God? (1972)
 Vous êtes de la police? (2007)
 Vous êtes jeunes vous êtes beaux (2018)
 The Vow: (1946 & 2012)
 A Vow to Kill (1995 TV)
 The Vows (1973)
 Vox Lux (2018)
 Vox populi (2008)
 Voy a hablar de la esperanza (1966)
 Voyage: (1993 & 2013)
 The Voyage: (1921 & 1974)
 Le Voyage à Alger (2009)
 Le Voyage en Amérique (1952)
 Voyage to the Bottom of the Sea (1961)
 The Voyage of the Bourrichon Family (1912)
 Voyage of the Damned (1976)
 The Voyage of Doctor Dolittle (2020)
 Le Voyage en douce (1980)
 Voyage to the End of the Universe (1963)
 Le Voyage étranger (1992)
 Voyage to the Planet of Prehistoric Women (1968)
 Voyage to the Prehistoric Planet (1965)
 Voyage of the Rock Aliens (1984)
 The Voyage that Shook the World (2009)
 Voyage of Terror (1998 TV)
 Voyage of Terror: The Achille Lauro Affair (1990 TV)
 Voyage in Time (1983)
 Voyage of Time (2016)
 Voyage of the Unicorn (2001)
 Voyager (1991)
 The Voyager (1991)
 Voyagers (2021)
 Voyeur (2017)
 The Voyeur: (1970 & 1994)
The Voyeurs (2021)
 Le Voyou (1970)
 A Voz do Carnaval (1933)
 Vozvrashcheniye (2003)

Vr–Vy

 Vrať se do hrobu! (1990)
 Vroom Vroom Vroooom (1995)
 Vrouwenoogen (1912)
 Vrudhanmare Sookshikkuka (1995)
 Vše pro lásku (1930)
 Vu (2014)
 Vuelve el ojo de vidrio (1970)
 Vuelvo a vivir, vuelvo a cantar (1971)
 Vuga (2000)
 Vuk (1981)
 Vuk samotnjak (1972)
 Vukovar, jedna priča (1994)
 Vukovar: The Way Home (1994)
 Vulcan, Son of Giove (1962)
 Vulgar (2000)
 The Vulgar Hours (2011)
 Vulgaria (2012)
 The Vulture: (1937, 1967, 1981 & 1982)
 The Vulture Wally: (1921, 1940 & 1956)
 The Vulture's Eye (2004)
 The Vultures (1975)
 Vultures of the Sea (1928)
 Vunnadhi Okate Zindagi (2017)
 Vurun Kahpeye (1973)
 Vyaamoham (1978)
 The Vyborg Side (1939)
 Vykuntapali (2011)
 Vyooham (1990)
 Vysotsky. Thank You For Being Alive (2011)
 Vzdušné torpédo 48 (1937)

W

 W: (1974 & 2014)
 W. (2008)
 The WAC from Walla Walla (1952)
 WALL-E (2008)
 W biały dzień (1981)
 W.C. (2007)
 W. C. Fields and Me (1976)
 W./E. (2011)
 W la foca (1982)
 W le donne (1970)
 W.M.D. (2013)
 WMD-The Inside Story (2008)
 WNUF Halloween Special (2013)
 W/O Ram (2018)
 W/o V. Vara Prasad (1998)
 The W Plan (1930)
 W.R.: Mysteries of the Organism (1971)
 W's Tragedy (1984)
 WTF! (2017)
 WUSA (1970)
 W.W. and the Dixie Dancekings (1975)
 WWII: The Long Road Home (2017)
 WWW (2021)
 WWW - What a Wonderful World (2006)
 WXIII: Patlabor the Movie 3 (2002)
 WΔZ (2007)

Wa

Waa–Waf

 Waada (1957)
 Waah! Tera Kya Kehna (2002)
 Waah Zindagi (2019)
 Waakya (2017)
 Waapasi (2013)
 Waar (2013)
 Waar 2 (TBD)
 Waaris (1988)
 Waarish (2004)
 Waarrior Savitri (2016)
 Waati (1995)
 Wabash Avenue (1950)
 Wabbit Twouble (1941)
 The Wabbit Who Came to Supper (1942)
 The Wackiest Ship in the Army (1960)
 The Wackiest Wagon Train in the West (1976)
 Wackiki Wabbit (1943)
 The Wackness (2008)
 Wacko (1982)
 Wacky Blackout (1942)
 Wacky-Bye Baby (1948)
 The Wacky World of Mother Goose (1967)
 The Wacky Wabbit (1942)
 Waco: (1952 & 1966)
 Waco, the Big Lie (1993)
 Waco: The Rules of Engagement (1997)
 Wacuś (1935)
 Wada Bari Tarzan Mathisabayata (2008)
 Wadda Khan (1983)
 Wade (2020)
 Wadjah Seorang Laki-laki (1971)
 Wadjda (2012)
 Wafa: A Deadly Love Story (2008)
 Wafadaar (1985)
 Waffle Street (2015)

Wag–Wah

 Wag the Dog (1997)
 Wag Kang Lilingon (2006)
 Waga Koi wa Moenu (1949)
 Wagah (2016)
 The Wager: (1998 & 2007)
 A Wager Between Two Magicians, or Jealous of Myself (1904)
 The Wages of Fear (1953)
 The Wages of Sin: (1918, 1929 & 1938)
 Wages of Virtue (1924)
 Wages for Wives (1925)
 Waghoba: Provider, Destroyer, Deity (2016)
 Waging a Living (2005)
 Wagner's Dream (2012)
 Wagon Heels (1945)
 Wagon Master (1950)
 The Wagon Master (1929)
 The Wagon Show (1928)
 The Wagon and the Star (1936)
 Wagon Team (1952)
 Wagon Tracks (1919)
 Wagon Tracks West (1943)
 Wagon Train (1940)
 Wagon Wheels (1934)
 Wagon Wheels Westward (1945)
 Wagons East! (1994)
 Wagons West (1952)
 Wagons Westward (1940)
 Wah Do Dem (2009)
 Wah Taj (2016)
 Wah-Wah (2005)
 Wahan Ke Log (1967)
 Wahnfried (1986)

Wai–Waj

 The Waif and the Wizard (1901)
 Waikiki (1980)
 Waikiki Brothers (2001)
 Waikiki Wedding (1936)
 The Wailing (2016)
 Waisa Bhi Hota Hai Part II (2003)
 Waissman (2010 TV)
 Waist Deep (2006)
 The Wait: (2013 & 2015)
 Wait for Me (1943)
 Wait for Me and I Will Not Come (2009)
 Wait for Me in Heaven (1988)
 Wait and See (1928)
 Wait till the Sun Shines, Nellie (1952)
 Wait 'til This Year (2004)
 Wait till Your Mother Gets Home! (1983)
 Wait 'til You're Older (2005)
 Wait Till Helen Comes (2016)
 Wait Until Dark (1967)
 Wait Until Spring, Bandini (1989)
 Wait for Your Laugh (2017)
 Waiter (2006)
 Waiter! (1983)
 The Waiters' Ball (1916)
 The Waiters' Picnic (1913)
 Waiting: (1991, 2007 & 2015)
 Waiting... (2005)
 Waiting Alone (2005)
 Waiting for Armageddon (2009)
 Waiting for the Barbarians (2019)
 Waiting for Caroline (1969)
 Waiting at the Church (1906)
 The Waiting City (2010)
 Waiting to Exhale (1995)
 Waiting for Fidel (1974)
 Waiting for Forever (2011)
 The Waiting Game (1999)
 Waiting for Godik (2007)
 Waiting for Guffman (1996)
 Waiting for Happiness (2002)
 Waiting for the Light (1990)
 Waiting for Love (1981)
 Waiting for the Moon (1987)
 The Waiting Room: (2007, 2010, 2012 & 2015)
 Waiting at the Royal (2000)
 Waiting for Rain (2021)
 Waiting for Summer (2012)
 Waiting for "Superman" (2010)
 Waiting for Woody (1998)
 Waitress (2007)
 Waitress! (1981)
 Wajahh: A Reason to Kill (2004)
 Wajib (2017)
 Wajma (An Afghan Love Story) (2013)
 Wajood: (1998 & 2018)

Wak

 Wakamba! (1955)
 Wake: (2003, 2009 & cancelled)
 The Wake: (1986 & 2005)
 The Wake of Calum MacLeod (2006)
 Wake of Death (2004)
 The Wake of Dick Johnson (2016)
 Wake in Fright (1971)
 Wake Island (1942)
 Wake Me When It's Over (1960)
 Wake Me When the War Is Over (1969 TV)
 Wake Up and Die (1966)
 Wake Up and Dream: (1934 & 1946)
 Wake Up Famous (1937)
 Wake Up the Gypsy in Me (1933)
 Wake Up India (2013)
 Wake Island (1942)
 Wake Up Little Susie (1988)
 Wake Up and Live (1937)
 Wake Up Morocco (2006)
 A Wake in Providence (1999)
 Wake of the Red Witch (1948)
 Wake Up, Ron Burgundy: The Lost Movie (2004)
 Wake Up Sid (2009)
 Wake Up and Smell the Coffee (2001)
 Wake Wood (2009)
 Wakefield (2016)
 The Wakefield Case (1921)
 Wakeful Eyes (1956)
 The Wakhan Front (2015)
 Waking the Dead (2000)
 Waking Life (2001)
 Waking Madison (2011)
 Waking Ned Devine (1998)
 Waking Sleeping Beauty (2009)
 Waking Up the Nation (2002)
 Waking Up in Reno (2002)
 Waking Up the Town (1925)
 Wakko's Wish (1999)
 Wako (2015)

Wal–Wam

 Wal-Mart: The High Cost of Low Price (2005)
 Walden (1968)
 The Waldheim Waltz (2018)
 Waldo Salt: A Screenwriter's Journey (1990)
 Waldo's Last Stand (1940)
 Walesa: Man of Hope (2013)
 The Walk: (1953, 2001, & 2015)
 Walk All over Me (2007)
 A Walk Among the Tombstones (2014)
 Walk the Angry Beach (1968)
 Walk Away Renee (2011)
 A Walk to Beautiful (2007)
 A Walk in the Clouds (1995)
 Walk a Crooked Mile (1948)
 Walk a Crooked Path (1969)
 Walk the Dark Street (1956)
 Walk East on Beacon (1952)
 Walk Hard: The Dewey Cox Story (2007)
 Walk Into Paradise (1956)
 Walk Like a Dragon (1960)
 Walk Like a Man: (1987 & 2008)
 Walk the Line (2005)
 A Walk with Love and Death (1969)
 Walk with Me (2017)
 A Walk on the Moon (1999)
 Walk like a Panther (2018)
 Walk Proud (1979)
 Walk the Proud Land (1956)
 A Walk to Remember (2002)
 Walk of Shame (2014)
 Walk Softly, Stranger (1950)
 A Walk in the Spring Rain (1970)
 A Walk in the Sun: (1945 & 1978)
 Walk and Talk (2009)
 Walk the Talk (2001)
 Walk Tall (1960)
 Walk a Tightrope (1964)
 Walk the Walk (1970)
 Walk on Water (2004)
 Walk on the Wild Side (1962)
 A Walk in the Woods (2015)
 Walk, Don't Run (1966)
 Walk. Ride. Rodeo. (2019)
 The Walk-Offs (1920)
 Walkabout (1971)
 The Walker (2007)
 Walker (1987)
 Walker Payne (2006)
 Walking Across Egypt (1999)
 Walking on Air (1936)
 The Walking Dead: (1936 & 1995)
 Walking on Dead Fish (2008)
 The Walking Deceased (2015)
 Walking with Dinosaurs (2013)
 Walking the Edge (1985)
 Walking with the Enemy (2014)
 The Walking Hills (1949)
 Walking My Baby Back Home (1953)
 Walking Out (2017)
 Walking to Paris (TBD)
 The Walking Stick (1970)
 Walking on Sunshine (2014)
 Walking and Talking (1996)
 Walking Tall: (1973 & 2004)
 Walking Tall Part 2 (1975)
 Walking Tall: Final Chapter (1977)
 Walking Tall: Lone Justice (2007)
 Walking Tall: The Payback (2007) 
 The Walking Target (1960)
 Walking on Water (2002)
 Walking to the Waterline (1998)
 Walky Talky Hawky (1946)
 The Wall: (1962, 1966, 1967, 1998 American, 1998 Belgian, 2011, 2012 & 2017)
 Wall of Noise (1963)
 Wall Street: (1929 & 1987)
 Wall Street: Money Never Sleeps (2010)
 Wall Street Cowboy (1939)
 The Wall Street Whiz (1925)
 The Wall That Heals (1997)
 Wallace & Gromit series:
 Wallace & Gromit in The Wrong Trousers (1993)
 Wallace & Gromit: The Best of Aardman Animation (1996)
 Wallace & Gromit: The Curse of the Were-Rabbit (2005)
 Walled In (2009)
 Wallflower (1948)
 Wallflowers (1928)
 Wallis & Edward (2005)
 Walls (1984)
 The Walls Came Tumbling Down (1946)
 Walls of Fire (1971)
 Walls of Glass (1985)
 Walls of Gold (1933)
 The Walls of Hell (1964)
 The Walls of Jericho: (1914 & 1948)
 The Walls of Malapaga (1949)
 Walls of Prejudice (1920)
 Walls of Sand (1994)
 Walt Before Mickey (2015)
 Walt & El Grupo (2008)
 Walter: (1982 & 2015)
 Walter Wanger's Vogues of 1938 (1937)
 Waltz Across Texas (1982)
 Waltz with Bashir (2008)
 Waltz Time: (1933 & 1945)
 Waltz of the Toreadors (1962)
 Waltzes from Vienna (1933)
 Waltzing Matilda (1933)
 Waltzing Tilda (2017)
 Wamba, a Child of the Jungle (1913)
 Wamaq Azra (1946)

Wan

 Wan Pipel (1976)
 Wanda (1970)
 Wanda Nevada (1979)
 Wander Darkly (2020)
 The Wanderer: (1913, 1925, & 1967)
 The Wanderer in Bulgar (1989)
 Wanderer of the Wasteland: (1924, 1935 & 1945)
 Wanderers (2014)
 The Wanderers: (1956, 1973 & 1979)
 Wandering Daughters (1923)
 Wandering Detective: Black Wind in the Harbor (1961)
 Wandering Detective: Tragedy in Red Valley (1961)
 Wandering Fires (1925)
 Wandering Footsteps (1925)
 Wandering Ginza Butterfly (1972)
 Wandering Ginza Butterfly 2: She-Cat Gambler (1972)
 Wandering Girl (2018)
 Wandering Girls (1927)
 Wandering Husbands (1924)
 The Wandering Jew: (1923 & 1933)
 Wandering with the Moon (1945)
 Wandering Papas (1926)
 Wandering Shadows (2004)
 The Wandering Soap Opera (2017)
 Wandering Souls (1921)
 Wandering Streams (2010)
 The Wandering Swordsman (1970)
 Wanderlust: (2006 & 2012)
 Wanee & Junah (2001)
 Wangan Midnight: The Movie (2009)
 Wannabe (2005)
 The Wannabes (2003)
 Wanpaku Ōji no Orochi Taiji (1963)
 Want So Much To Believe (1971)
 Wanted: (1967, 2008, 2009, 2010, 2011, & 2015)
 Wanted! (1937)
 Wanted! Jane Turner (1936)
 Wanted: Babysitter (1975)
 Wanted: Dead or Alive: (1984 & 1987)

Wap–Waq

 Wapakman (2009)
 Waqt (1965)
 Waqt: The Race Against Time (2005)
 Waqt Hamara Hai (1993)
 Waqt Ka Badshah (1992)
 Waqt Ki Awaz (1988)
 Waqt Ki Deewar (1981)
 Waqt Ki Pukar (1984)

War

 War: (2002, 2007, 2014 & 2019)
 The War: (1994 & 2007)
 The War Against Mrs. Hadley (1942)
 War Arrow (1953)
 War Art with Eddie Redmayne (2015)
 War Babies (1932)
 The War Between Men and Women (1972)
 War Book (2014)
 The War Boys (2009)
 The War Bride (2001)
 War Brides (1916)
 The War on Britain's Jews? (2007)
 War of the Buttons: (1962 & 1994)
 War Chhod Na Yaar (2013)
 A War of Children (1972 TV)
 War of the Colossal Beast (1958)
 War Comes to America (1945)
 War Correspondent (1932)
 War Crimes (2005)
 War/Dance (2007)
 War of the Dead (2011)
 The War on Democracy (2007)
 War Department Report (1943)
 War Devils (1969)
 War Dogs: (1942, 1943 & 2016)
 War Drums (1957)
 War Eagle, Arkansas (2007)
 War on Everyone (2016)
 War Flowers (2012)
 The War Game (1965 TV)
 War Games: At the End of the Day (2011)
 The War of the Gargantuas (1966)
 War Goddess (1973)
 War Gods of Babylon (1962)
 The War with Grandpa (2020)
 The War at Home: (1979 & 1996)
 War Horse (2011)
 The War Horse (1927)
 War Hunt (1962)
 War Is Hell (1961)
 The War on Kids (2009)
 The War Lord (1965)
 War and Love (1985)
 The War Lover (1962)
 War Machine (2017)
 War Made Easy: How Presidents & Pundits Keep Spinning Us to Death (2007)
 The War for Men's Minds (1943)
 War Nurse (1930)
 The War Is Over: (1945 & 1966)
 War Paint: (1926 & 1953)
 War Party: (1965 & 1988)
 War and Peace: (1956, 1966–67 & 2002)
 War and Pieces (1964)
 War Pigs (2015)
 War Photographer (2001)
 War for the Planet of the Apes (2017)
 War Requiem (1989)
 War Room (2015)
 The War Room (1993)
 The War of the Roses (1989)
 War of the Satellites (1958)
 The War in Space (1977)
 War Story: (1989 & 2014)
 A War Story (1981)
 War on a String (2015)
 The War Tapes (2006)
 War on Terror (2011)
 The War Wagon (1967)
 War on Whistleblowers: Free Press and the National Security State (2013)
 The War Widow (1976 TV)
 War Witch (2012)
 The War Within (2005)
 War Wolves (2009)
 The War of the Worlds (1953)
 War of the Worlds (2005)
 War of the Worlds 2: The Next Wave (2008)
 War of the Worlds: Goliath (2012)
 War of the Worlds – The True Story (2012)
 The War You Don't See (2010)
 War Zone (1998)
 The War Zone (1999)
 War, Inc. (2008)
 War, Love, God, & Madness (2008)
 War-Gods of the Deep (1965)
 Warbus (1985)
 Warchild (2006)
 Warclouds in the Pacific (1941)
 Warcraft (2016)
 The Ward (2010)
 Ward No. 6 (2009)
 The Ware Case: (1917, 1928 & 1938)
 WarGames (1983)
 WarGames: The Dead Code (2008)
 Warhead (1977)
 Warkill (1968)
 Warlock: (1959 & 1989)
 Warlock: The Armageddon (1993)
 Warlock III: The End of Innocence (1999)
 Warlock Moon (1973)
 The Warlord: Battle for the Galaxy (1998 TV)
 The Warlords (2007)
 Warlords of Atlantis (1978)
 Warm Bodies (2013)
 A Warm Corner (1930)
 A Warm December (1973)
 Warm Nights on a Slow Moving Train (1988)
 Warm Spring (2002)
 Warm Springs (2005)
 Warm Water Under a Red Bridge (2001)
 Warming Up (1983)
 Warn London (1934)
 Warn That Man (1943)
 Warned Off (1930)
 Warning: (1946, 2013, 2015 & 2021)
 The Warning: (1927, 1928, 1980, 2015 & 2018)
 Warning Shot: (1967 & 2018)
 Warning Sign (1985)
 Warning from Space (1956)
 Warning to Wantons (1949)
 Warning: Parental Advisory (2002)
 Warpath (1951)
 Warren Beatty: Mister Hollywood (2015)
 The Warren Case (1934)
 Warren Ellis: Captured Ghosts (2011)
 Warrendale (1967)
 The Warrens of Virginia: (1915 & 1924)
 Warrior: (2007 & 2011)
 The Warrior (2015)
 Warrior Champions: From Baghdad to Beijing (2009)
 The Warrior Class (2007)
 Warrior King (2006)
 Warrior of the Lost World (1983)
 The Warrior and the Sorceress (1984)
 The Warrior Strain (1919)
 The Warrior and the Wolf (2009)
 Warrior's End (2009)
 The Warriors Gate (2016)
 A Warrior's Heart (2011)
 The Warrior's Husband (1933)
 The Warrior's Way (2010)
 The Warriors (1979)
 Warriors of the Apocalypse: (1985 & 2009)
 Warriors of Faith (1947)
 Warriors Five (1960)
 Warriors of Future (2022)
 The Warriors Gate (2016)
 Warriors of Heaven and Earth (2004)
 Warriors of Virtue (1997)
 Warriors of Virtue: The Return to Tao (2002)
 Warriors of the Wasteland (1983)
 Warsaw 44 (2014)
 Warsaw Premiere (1951)
 Wartime Nutrition (1943)

Was

 Was He a Coward? (1911)
 Was She Guilty? (1922)
 Was She Justified? (1922)
 Was wäre, wenn...? (1960)
 Wasabi (2001)
 Wasabi Tuna (2003)
 Wasana (1976)
 Waseskun (2016)
 The Wash: (1988 & 2001)
 Wash Me in the River (2022)
 Washed Out (1995)
 Washee Ironee (1934)
 Washi to Taka (1957)
 Washington Heights (2002)
 The Washington Masquerade (1932)
 Washington Melodrama (1941)
 Washington Merry-Go-Round (1932)
 Washington Square (1997)
 Washington Story (1952)
 Wasp: (2003 & 2015)
 Wasp Network (2019)
 Wasp Wings (1945)
 The Wasp Woman: (1959 & 1995)
 Wassanaye Sanda (2018)
 Wassane Senehasa (2012)
 Wassup Rockers (2006)
 The Wasted Times (2016)
 Wasteland (2013)
 The Wasting (2017)
 Wasting Away (2007)
 The Wastrel (1961)

Wat

 Wat's Pig (1996)
 Watch (2001)
 The Watch: (2008 & 2012)
 Watch Beverly (1932)
 Watch the Birdie: (1950 & 1958)
 Watch Horror Films, Keep America Strong! (2008)
 Watch It (1993)
 Watch Out (2008)
 Watch Out, We're Mad (1976)
 Watch on the Rhine (1943)
 Watch it, Sailor! (1961)
 Watch the Shadows Dance (1987)
 Watch Your Stern (1960)
 Watch Your Wife (1926)
 Watcher (2022)
 The Watcher: (2000 & 2016)
 The Watcher in the Woods: (1980 & 2017)
 Watchers series:
 Watchers (1988)
 Watchers II (1990)
 Watchers 3 (1994)
 Watchers Reborn (1998)
 Watchers of the Sky (2014)
 Watchhouse in the Carpathians (1914)
 Watching the Detectives (2007)
 Watchmen (2009)
 Watchtower (2001)
 Water: (1985 & 2005)
 The Water: (2009 & 2022)
 The Water Babies (1978)
 Water Birds (1952)
 The Water Boatman (2016)
 Water Boyy (2015)
 The Water Diviner (2014)
 Water Drops on Burning Rocks (2000)
 Water for Elephants (2011)
 The Water Engine (1992 TV)
 The Water Gipsies (1932)
 The Water Horse: Legend of the Deep (2007)
 Water Lady (1979)
 Water Lilies (2007)
 The Water Lily (1919)
 Water Ritual 1: An Urban Rite of Purification (1979)
 Water Rustlers (1939)
 Water on the Table (2010)
 Water, Water Every Hare (1952)
 Water, Water, Everywhere (1920)
 Water's Journey: The Hidden Rivers of Florida (2003)
 Waterbomb for the Fat Tomcat (2004)
 Waterborne (2005)
 The Waterboy (1998)
 Waterboys (2001)
 The Watercolor (2009)
 Watercolor Painting in a Rainy Day (1989)
 Watercolor Painting in a Rainy Day 2 (1993)
 Watercolor Postcards (2012)
 Watercolors (2008) 
 The Waterdance (1992)
 Waterfront: (1939, 1944 & 1950)
 Waterfront Lady (1935)
 Waterfront at Midnight (1948)
 Waterhole No. 3 (1967)
 Waterland (1992)
 Waterlife (2009)
 Waterlily Jaguar (2018)
 Waterloo: (1929 & 1970)
 Waterloo Bridge: (1931 & 1940)
 Waterloo Road (1945)
 Watermarks (2004)
 Watermelon (2003)
 The Watermelon (2008)
 Watermelon Man (1970)
 The Watermelon Woman (1996)
 Waterproof (2000)
 Watership Down (1978)
 Waterwalker (1984)
 Waterworld (1995)
 Wattstax (1973)
 Watusi (1959)

Wav–Waz

 The Wave: (1981, 2008, 2015 & 2019)
 Wave Twisters (2001)
 A Wave, a WAC and a Marine (1944)
 Wavelength: (1967 & 1983)
 Waveriders (2008)
 Waves (2019)
 Waves of Fate (1918)
 Waves of Life and Love (1921)
 Waves of Lust (1975)
 Waves for Water (2017)
 Wax: or the Discovery of Television Among the Bees (1991)
 Wax Mask (1997)
 The Wax Model (1917)
 Wax Works (1934)
 Waxie Moon in Fallen Jewel (2011)
 Waxwork (1988)
 Waxwork II: Lost in Time (1992)
 Waxworks (1924)
 The Way: (2010 & 2017)
 The Way Ahead (1944)
 The Way of All Flesh (1927)
 The Way of All Men (1930)
 The Way Back: (2010 & 2020)
 Way Back Home: (1931, 2011 & 2013)
 Way Down East: (1920 & 1935)
 Way Down South (1939)
 The Way of the Dragon (1972)
 Way of a Gaucho (1952)
 The Way to the Gold (1957)
 The Way of the Gun (2000)
 The Way Home: (2002, 2010 American, & 2010 Indian)
 The Way I See It (2020)
 The Way It Is (1985)
 A Way of Life: (2004 & 2016)
 The Way of Lost Souls (1929)
 The Way to Love (1933)
 The Way of a Man with a Maid (1918)
 Way Out (1967)
 Way Out West: (1930 & 1937)
 A Way Out of the Wilderness (1968)
 The Way of Peace (1947)
 Way for a Sailor (1930)
 The Way to the Sea (1936)
 The Way to the Stars (1945)
 The Way of the Strong (1919)
 Way Up Thar (1935)
 The Way of War (2009)
 The Way Way Back (2013)
 The Way We Get By (2009)
 The Way We Live Now (1970)
 The Way We Were (1973)
 The Way West (1967)
 The Way of the West (1934)
 Way of the Wicked (2014)
 The Way of the Wind (TBD)
 The Way of the World: (1916 & 1920)
 The Way of Youth (1934)
 Way...Way Out (1966)
 waydowntown (2000)
 Wayne's World (1992)
 Wayne's World 2 (1993)
 Ways to Live Forever (2010)
 Wayward (1932)
 The Wayward Bus (1957)
 The Wayward Cloud (2005)
 The Wayward Girl (1957)
 Wayward Son (1999)
 Waza no Tabibito (2011)
 Wazir (2016)
 Le Wazzou polygame (1971)

We

 We: (1982, 2018 & 2022)
 We All Die Alone (2021)
 We All Fall Down: (1997 & 2000)
 We All Loved Each Other So Much (1974)
 We the Animals (2018)
 We Are All Demons (1969)
 We Are All Murderers (1952)
 We Are All in Temporary Liberty (1971)
 We Are the Best! (2013)
 We Are Brothers (2014)
 We Are Dad (2005)
 We Are the Faithful (2005)
 We Are Family: (2010 & 2016)
 We Are the Flesh (2016)
 We Are the Freaks (2013)
 We Are the Giant (2014)
 We Are Gold (2019)
 We Are the Heat (2018)
 The We and the I (2012) 
 We Are from Jazz (1983)
 We Are Kings (2014)
 We Are the Lambeth Boys (1959)
 We Are Legion (2012) 
 We Are Little Zombies (2019)
 We Are Many (2014)
 We Are the Marines (1942)
 We Are Marshall (2006)
 We Are Never Alone (2016)
 We Are the Night (2010)
 We Are No Angels (1975)
 We Are Northern Lights (2013)
 We Are Not Angels (1992)
 We Are Not Angels 3: Rock & Roll Strike Back (2006)
 We Are Not Children (1934)
 We Are Not Married (1946)
 We Are Not Alone: (1939 & 1993)
 We Are the Others (2017)
 We Are the People We've Been Waiting For (2009)
 We Are Poets (2011)
 We Are Still Here: (2015 & 2022)
 We Are the Strange (2007)
 We Are Together (2006)
 We Are Twisted Fucking Sister! (2014)
 We Are What We Are: (2010 & 2013)
 We Are X (2016)
 We Are Young. We Are Strong (2014)
 We Are Your Friends (2015)
 We Believe: Chicago and Its Cubs (2009)
 We Believed (2010)
 We Belong to the Imperial-Royal Infantry Regiment (1926)
 We Bought a Zoo (2011)
 We Can't Change the World. But, We Wanna Build a School in Cambodia. (2011)
 We Can't Go Home Again (1973)
 We Can't Have Everything (1918)
 We Can't Live Without Cosmos (2015)
 We Can't Make the Same Mistake Twice (2016)
 We Cellar Children (1960)
 We Come During Spring (1953)
 We Come as Friends (2014)
 We Danced Around the World (1939)
 We Did It (1936)
 We Dive at Dawn (1943)
 We Do (2015)
 We Don't Belong Here (2017)
 We Don't Live Here Anymore (2004)
 We Dreamed America (2008)
 We Faw Down (1928)
 We Feed the World (2005)
 We Forgot to Break Up (2017)
 We Free Kings (1996)
 We Go Fast (1941)
 We Go Way Back (2006)
 We Have Always Lived in the Castle (2018)
 We Have to Marry Them Off (1953)
 We Have Only One Life (1958)
 We Have Our Moments (1937)
 We Have a Pope (2011)
 We Iraqis (2004)
 We Jam Econo (2005)
 We Joined the Navy (1962)
 We Live Again (1934)
 We Live in Public (2009)
 We Live In Two Worlds (1937)
 We Lived for Estonia (1997)
 We the Living (1942)
 We Love You, Sally Carmichael (2017)
 We Maids (1951)
 We Make Movies (2016)
 We Make Music (1942)
 We Married Margo (2000)
 We Meet at Tove's (1946)
 We Moderns (1925)
 We Monsters (2015)
 We Must Do Our Best (1909)
 We Need to Do Something (2021)
 We Need to Talk About Kevin (2011)
 We Need to Talk about Dad (2011)
 We Never Die (1993)
 We of the Never Never (1982)
 We Never Sleep (1917)
 We Not Naughty (2012)
 We and Our Mountains (1969)
 We Own the Night (2007)
 We the Party (2012)
 We Ride: The Story of Snowboarding (2013)
 We Shall Overcome (2006)
 We Shall Return (1963)
 We Shall See (1964)
 We Steal Secrets: The Story of WikiLeaks (2013)
 We Stick Together Through Thick and Thin (1929)
 We Still Kill the Old Way: (1967 & 2014)
 We Summon the Darkness (2019)
 We Thieves Are Honourable: (1942 & 1956)
 We Think the World of You (1988)
 We Three Debutantes (1953)
 We Too Walked on the Moon (2009)
 We Two Alone (1952)
 We from the Urals (1944)
 We Want a Child! (1949)
 We Want the Colonels (1973)
 We Want Our Mummy (1939)
 We Went to College (1936)
 We Were Children (2012)
 We Were Dancing (1942)
 We Were Here (2011)
 We Were the Mulvaneys (2002)
 We Were Once a Fairytale (2009)
 We Were Seven Sisters (1939)
 We Were Seven Widows (1939)
 We Were So Beloved (1985)
 We Were Soldiers (2002)
 We Were Strangers (1949)
 We Were Wolves (2014)
 We Were Young (1961)
 We Who Are About to Die (1937)
 We Who Are Young (1940)
 We Who Go the Kitchen Route (1953)
 We Will All Go to Paris (1950)
 We Will Be the World Champions (2015)
 We Will Go to Deauville (1962)
 We Women (1925)
 We Won't Grow Old Together (1972)
 We Work Again (1937)
 We, the Animals Squeak! (1941)
 We, the Women (1953)
 We'll Live Till Monday (1968)
 We'll Meet Again: (1943 & 2002)
 We'll Meet Again in the Heimat (1926)
 We'll Never Have Paris (2014)
 We'll Really Hurt You (1998)
 We'll Smile Again (1942)
 We'll Take Care of the Teachers (1970)
 We'll Take Her Children in Amongst Our Own (1915)
 We'll Take Manhattan: (1990 & 2012)
 We'll Talk About Love Later (1953)
 We're All Christs (2006)
 We're All Gamblers (1927)
 We're All Going to the World's Fair (2021)
 We're All Necessary (1956)
 We're Back! A Dinosaur's Story (1993)
 We're Dancing on the Rainbow (1952)
 We're Going to Be Rich (1938)
 We're Going to Eat You (1980)
 We're Going Separate Ways (1957)
 We're Here to Help (2007)
 We're on the Jury (1937)
 We're in the Legion Now! (1936)
 We're Livin' on Dog Food (2009)
 We're the Millers (2013)
 We're in the Money (1935)
 We're in the Navy Now (1926)
 We're No Angels: (1955 & 1989)
 We're No Bad Guys (1997)
 We're No Monks (2004)
 We're Not Dressing (1934)
 We're Not Married! (1952)
 We're Only Human (1935)
 We're Rich Again (1934)
 We're Talking Serious Money (1991)
 We've Never Been Licked (1943)

Wea–Web

 The Weak-End Party (1922)
 Weak Spot (1975)
 The Weak and the Wicked (1954)
 A Weak Woman (1933)
 The Weaker Sex: (1917, 1933 & 1948)
 The Weakly Reporter (1944)
 The Weakness of the Bolshevik (2003)
 The Weakness of Man (1916)
 The Weakness of Strength (1916)
 Wealth (1921)
 Wealth Without a Future (1939)
 The Weapon (1956)
 The Weapon, the Hour & the Motive (1972)
 WEAPONS (2007)
 Weapons of Death (1977)
 Weapons of Mass Distraction (1997)
 The Weapons of Youth (1913)
 The Wearing of the Grin (1951)
 Wearing Velvet Slippers under a Golden Umbrella (1970)
 Weary River (1929)
 A Weary Road (1956)
 Weary Willies (1929)
 Weary Willie's Rags (1914)
 Weasel Stop (1955)
 Weasel While You Work (1958)
 Weather Girl (2009)
 Weather Is Good on Deribasovskaya, It Rains Again on Brighton Beach (1992)
 The Weather Man (2005)
 The Weather Station (1923)
 The Weather Underground (2002)
 Weathering with You (2019)
 The Weatherman and the Shadowboxer (2014)
 A Weaver of Dreams (1918)
 The Weavers: (1905 & 1927)
 Weavers of Fortune (1922)
 The Weavers of Nishijin (1961)
 The Weavers: Wasn't That a Time! (1982)
 Weaving Girl (2009)
 Web (2013)
 The Web (1947)
 Web of Danger (1947)
 The Web of Deceit (1920)
 Web of Deception (1994 TV)
 The Web of Desire (1917)
 Web of Fate (1927)
 Web Junkie (2013)
 Web of Love (1998)
 Web of Passion (1959)
 Web of the Spider (1971)
 Web of Suspicion (1959)
 Webmaster (1998)
 Webs (2003)
 The Webster Boy (1962)

Wed

 Weda Beri Tarzan (2007)
 Weddad (1936)
 A Wedding: (1978 & 2016)
 The Wedding: (1944, 1972, 2000, 2004, 2018 & 2021)
 Wedding Anniversary (2017)
 The Wedding Banquet (1993)
 Wedding in Barenhof (1942)
 Wedding Bell Blues (1996)
 A Wedding for Bella (2001)
 Wedding Bells: (1921, 1933 & 1954)
 Wedding in Bessarabia (2009)
 Wedding Bills (1927)
 Wedding in Blood (1973)
 The Wedding Camels (1980)
 Wedding Campaign (2005)
 The Wedding Chest (2006)
 Wedding Crashers (2005)
 The Wedding Date (2005)
 Wedding Day (1942)
 Wedding Days (2002)
 Wedding Daze: (2004 TV & 2006) 
 The Wedding Director (2006) 
 Wedding Doll (2015)
 A Wedding in the Dream (1948)
 Wedding Dress (2010)
 Wedding with Erika (1950)
 Wedding in Galilee (1987)
 The Wedding Game (2009)
 Wedding Group (1936)
 The Wedding Guest: (1916 & 2018)
 The Wedding Hotel (1944)
 A Wedding Invitation (2013)
 Wedding at Lake Wolfgang (1933)
 The Wedding of Lilli Marlene (1953)
 The Wedding Maidens (1990)
 Wedding in Malinovka (1967)
 The Wedding March: (1915, 1928, 1929, 1934 & 2016)
 Wedding Night (2001)
 The Wedding Night (1935)
 Wedding Night – End of the Song (1992)
 Wedding Night in Paradise: (1950 & 1962)
 Wedding in Paris (2011)
 The Wedding Party: (1969 & 2016)
 The Wedding Party 2 (2017)
 The Wedding Planner (2001)
 Wedding Present (1936)
 Wedding Pullav (2015)
 Wedding Rehearsal (1932)
 The Wedding Ringer (2015)
 Wedding Rings (1929)
 Wedding of Silence (2004)
 The Wedding Singer (1998)
 The Wedding Song (1917)
 A Wedding Suit (1976)
 The Wedding Tackle (2000)
 Wedding Tayo, Wedding Hindi (2011)
 Wedding in Transit (1953) 
 The Wedding Video: (2003 & 2012)
 Wedding Wars (2006)
 Wedding in White (1972)
 Wedding Worries (1941)
 The Wedding Year (2019)
 Weddings and Babies (1960)
 Weddings Are Wonderful (1938)
 Wedlock (1991)
 Wedlock Deadlock (1947)
 A Wednesday! (2008)
 Wednesday, May 9 (2015)
 Wednesday's Child (1934)
 Wednesday's Luck (1936)

Wee–Weh

 Wee Lady Betty (1917)
 Wee MacGregor's Sweetheart (1922)
 The Wee Man (2013)
 Wee Wee Monsieur (1938)
 Wee Willie Winkie (1937)
 Wee-Willie Wildcat (1953)
 Weeds: (1987 & 2017)
 Weeds on Fire (2016)
 Week End Husbands (1924)
 Week Ends Only (1932)
 The Week Of (2018)
 The Week of the Sphinx (1990)
 Week-end (1935)
 Le Week-End (2013)
 The Week-End (1920)
 Week-End with Father (1951)
 Week-End in Havana (1941)
 Week-End Marriage (1932)
 Week-End Pass (1944)
 Week-End for Three (1941)
 Week-End at the Waldorf (1945)
 A Week's Vacation (1980)
 Weekend: (1967, 2010 & 2011)
 The Weekend: (2016 & 2018)
 Weekend at Bernie's (1989)
 Weekend at Bernie's II (1993)
 The Weekend Bride (1928)
 Weekend of a Champion (1972)
 Weekend at Dunkirk (1964)
 Weekend Getaway (2012)
 Weekend, Italian Style (1966)
 Weekend with Kate (1990)
 Weekend Lover (1995)
 A Weekend with Lulu (1961)
 Weekend Magic (1927)
 Weekend with my Mother (2009)
 The Weekend Murders (1970)
 The Weekend Nun (1972)
 Weekend in Paradise: (1931 & 1952)
 Weekend Pass (1984)
 Weekend of Shadows (1978)
 Weekend of Terror (1970 TV)
 Weekend War (1988 TV)
 Weekend Warriors (1986)
 Weekend Wives (1928)
 Weekender (2011)
 Weekends (2017)
 Weekends in Normandy (2014)
 Weenie Roast (1931)
 Weepah Way for Now (2015)
 Weeping for a Bandit (1964)
 Weeping Willow (2014)
 Weerawarna (2016)
 Weergevonden (1914)
 Wehe, wenn er losgelassen (1932)
 Wehshi Daku (1982)
 Wehshi Gujjar (1979)

Wei–Wek

 Weighed But Found Wanting (1974)
 The Weight (2012)
 The Weight of Chains (2010)
 The Weight of Chains 2 (2014)
 The Weight of Water (2000)
 Weil ich dich liebe... (1969)
 Weiner (2016)
 The Weird Doll (2016)
 Weird Science (1985)
 Weird Tales (1994)
 The Weird Villa (2004)
 Weird Woman (1944)
 The Weird World of Blowfly (2010)
 Weird: The Al Yankovic Story (2022)
 The Weirdo Hero (2015)
 Weirdos (2016)
 Weirdsville (2007)
 Weite Straßen – stille Liebe (1969)
 Weiße Wölfe (1969)
 Weißes Blut (1959)
 Wekande Walauwa (2002)

Wel

 Welcome: (1986, 2007 & 2009)
 Welcome to 18 (1986)
 Welcome 2 Ibiza (2002)
 Welcome 2 Karachi (2015)
 Welcome Aboard Toxic Airlines (2007)
 Welcome to Acapulco (2019)
 Welcome to Arrow Beach (1974)
 Welcome to Australia (1999)
 Welcome Back (2015)
 Welcome Back Gandhi (2014)
 Welcome Back, Mr. McDonald (1997)
 Welcome to Blood City (1977)
 Welcome to Canada (1989)
 Welcome to Central Jail (2016)
 Welcome to Chechnya (2020)
 Welcome to the Club (1971)
 Welcome to Collinwood (2002)
 Welcome to Curiosity (2018)
 Welcome Danger (1929)
 Welcome to the Dollhouse (1995)
 Welcome to Dongmakgol (2005)
 Welcome to Durham, USA (2007)
 Welcome to F.L. (2015)
 Welcome to Germany (2016)
 Welcome to Happiness (2015)
 Welcome to Hard Times (1967)
 Welcome to Hollywood (1998)
 Welcome Home: (1925, 1935, 1989, 2004, 2006 & 2018)
 Welcome Home Brother Charles (1975)
 Welcome to Home Gori (1990)
 Welcome Home Roscoe Jenkins (2008)
 Welcome Home, Bobby (1986 TV)
 Welcome Home, Johnny Bristol (1972 TV)
 Welcome Home, Roxy Carmichael (1990)
 Welcome Home, Soldier Boys (1972)
 Welcome to the Jungle: (2007 & 2013)
 Welcome to Kodaikanal (1992)
 Welcome to L.A. (1976)
 Welcome to London (2015)
 Welcome to Leith (2015)
 Welcome to Macintosh (2008)
 Welcome to Marwen (2018)
 Welcome to Me (2014)
 Welcome M1LL10NS (2018)
 Welcome to Mooseport (2004)
 Welcome Mr. Marshall! (1953)
 Welcome Mr. President (2013)
 Welcome, Mr. Washington (1944)
 Welcome to My Nightmare (1976)
 Welcome to New York: (2012, 2014 & 2018)
 Welcome to Nollywood (2007)
 Welcome Obama (2013)
 Welcome to Pine Hill (2012)
 Welcome to the Punch (2013)
 Welcome to Pyongyang Animal Park (2001)
 Welcome to the Quiet Room (2007)
 Welcome, Reverend! (1950)
 Welcome to the Rileys (2010)
 Welcome to the Roses (2003)
 Welcome to Sajjanpur (2008)
 Welcome to Sarajevo (1997)
 Welcome to Shama Town (2010)
 Welcome to the Space Show (2010)
 Welcome to the Sticks (2008)
 Welcome Stranger: (1924 & 1947)
 Welcome the Stranger (2018)
 Welcome to Switzerland (2004)
 Welcome in Vienna (1986)
 Welcome to Willits (2016)
 Welcome to Wonderland (2006)
 Welcome to Woop Woop (1997)
 Welcome Zindagi (2015)
 Welcome, or No Trespassing (1964)
 Weli Pawuru (2019)
 Welikathara (1971)
 Well (2016)
 The Well: (1951 & 2015)
 The Well-Digger's Daughter: (1940 & 2011)
 Well Done: (2003 & 2016) 
 Well Done Abba (2009)
 Well Done, Henry (1936)
 Well-Founded Fear (2000)
 The Well Groomed Bride (1946)
 Well Oiled (1947)
 Well Wishes (2015)
 Well Worn Daffy (1965)
 Wellman (2003)
 Wells Fargo (1937)
 Wells Fargo Gunmaster (1951)
 Wells in Flames (1937)
 Wellwood (TBD)
 A Welsh Singer (1915)

Wen–Wer

 Wend Kuuni (1982)
 The Wendell Baker Story (2005)
 Wendell & Wild (2022)
 Wendigo (2001)
 Wendy (2020)
 Wendy Cracked a Walnut (1990)
 Wendy and Lucy (2009)
 Wendy Wu: Homecoming Warrior (2006)
 Wenn Ludwig ins Manöver zieht (1967)
 Went to Coney Island on a Mission from God... Be Back by Five (1998)
 Went the Day Well? (1942)
 Wer (2013)
 Wer seine Frau lieb hat (1955)
 Werckmeister Harmonies (2000)
 Were the World Mine (2008)
 The Werewolf: (1913 & 1956)
 Werewolf: (1996 & 2016)
 A Werewolf Boy (2012)
 Werewolf in a Girls' Dormitory (1961) 
 Werewolf of London (1935)
 Werewolf by Night (2022)
 Werewolf Rising (2014)
 The Werewolf of Washington (1973)
 Werewolf Woman (1976)
 The Werewolf of Woodstock (1975)
 Werewolf: The Beast Among Us (2012)
 Werewolves of the Third Reich (2017)
 Werewolves on Wheels (1971)
 Werewolves Within (2021)
 Werner – Beinhart! (1990)
 Werner Herzog Eats His Shoe (1980)
 Werther: (1927 & 1986)

Wes

 Wes Craven's Chiller (1985)
 Wes Craven's New Nightmare (1994)
 Wesley (2009)
 The Wesley's Mysterious File (2002)
 The West: (1938 & 1996)
 West: (2007 & 2013)
 West 32nd (2007)
 West 47th Street (2003)
 West of the Alamo (1946)
 West Beirut (1998)
 West of the Brazos (1950)
 West of Broadway: (1926 & 1931)
 West of Carson City (1940)
 West of Cimarron (1941)
 West of the Divide (1934)
 West of Hot Dog (1924)
 A West Lake Moment (2005)
 West of Memphis (2012)
 West of Nevada (1936)
 West of the Pecos: (1934 & 1945)
 West of the Pesos (1960)
 West Point (1928)
 The West Point Story (1950)
 West Point Widow (1941)
 West of the Rio Grande (1944)
 West of Santa Fe (1928)
 West of the Santa Fe (1938)
 West of Shanghai (1937)
 The West Side Kid (1943)
 West Side Story: (1961 & 2021)
 West of Singapore (1933)
 West and Soda (1965)
 West of Suez (1957)
 West of Thunder (2012)
 West of Tombstone (1942)
 West of the Water Tower (1923)
 West of Wyoming (1950)
 West of Zanzibar: (1928 & 1954)
 Westbound (1959)
 Westbound Mail (1937)
 Western: (1997 & 2017)
 Western Approaches (1944)
 Western Blood (1918)
 The Western Code (1932)
 Western Cyclone (1943)
 The Western Front (2010)
 Western Gold (1937)
 Western Heritage (1948)
 Western Jamboree (1938)
 Western Justice (1934)
 Western Limited (1932)
 Western Luck (1924)
 Western Mail (1942)
 Western Religion (2015)
 Western Trails (1938)
 Western Union (1941)
 The Western Wallop (1924)
 Western Whoopee (1930)
 The Western Whirlwind (1927)
 The Westerner: (1934 & 1940)
 The Westerner and the Earl (1911)
 Westerplatte (1967)
 Westfront 1918 (1930)
 Westinghouse Works, 1904 (1904)
 The Westland Case (1937)
 Westward Ho: (1935 & 1942)
 Westward Ho!: (1919 & 1940)
 Westward Ho the Wagons! (1952)
 Westward Passage (1932)
 Westward Whoa (1936)
 Westward the Women (1951)
 Westway to the World (2000)
 Westwind (2011)
 Westworld (1973)
 The West~Bound Limited (1923)

Wet–Wex

 Wet Blanket Policy (1948)
 Wet Dreams (2002)
 Wet Dreams 2 (2005)
 Wet Gold: (1921 & 1984)
 Wet Hare (1962)
 Wet Hot American Summer (2001)
 A Wet Knight (1932)
 Wet Paint: (1926 & 1946)
 The Wet Parade (1932)
 Wet Weekend (1979)
 Wetback: The Undocumented Documentary (2005)
 The Wetback Hound (1957)
 Wetherby (1985)
 Wetlands: (2011, 2013 & 2017)
 Wetware (2018)
 Wexford Plaza (2016)

Wh

Wha

 Whale (1970)
 The Whale: (2011, 2013 TV & 2022)
 Whale Music (1994)
 Whale Rider (2003)
 Whalers (1939)
 The Whales of August (1987)
 Wham Bam Slam (1955)
 Wham! Bam! Islam! (2011)
 Wham! in China: Foreign Skies (1986)
 Wharf Angel (1934)
 Wharf of Windows (2000)
 What About Bob? (1991)
 What Became of Jack and Jill? (1972)
 What Becomes of the Broken Hearted? (1999)
 What Becomes of the Children?: (1918 & 1936)
 What the Bleep Do We Know!? (2004)
 What the Daisy Said (1910)
 What to Do in Case of Fire (2001)
 What Dreams May Come (1998)
 What Ever Happened to... (1991 TV)
 What Ever Happened to Aunt Alice? (1969)
 What Ever Happened to Baby Jane? (1962)
 What Ever Happened to Baby Toto (1964)
 What to Expect When You're Expecting (2012)
 What a Girl Wants (2003)
 What Happened to Mary (1912)
 What Happened Was (1994)
 What Happens in Vegas... (2008)
 What Have I Done to Deserve This? (1985)
 What Have You Done to Solange? (1975)
 What If? (2013)
 What Josiah Saw (2021)
 What Just Happened (2008)
 What Keeps You Alive (2018)
 What Lies Beneath (2000)
 What Lola Wants (2015)
 What Love Is (2006)
 What Maisie Knew (2013)
 What Men Want (2019)
 What a Night!: (1928 & 1931)
 What Planet Are You From? (2000)
 What Price Glory: (1926 & 1952)
 What Price Hollywood? (1932)
 What Richard Did (2012)
 What Time Is It There? (2001)
 What a Way to Go! (1964)
 What We Do in the Shadows (2014)
 What a Wife Learned (1923)
 What Women Want (2000)
 What a Wonderful Family! (2016)
 What You Mean We? (1987 TV)
 What! No Beer? (1933)
 What's Autumn? (1977)
 What's Bugging Seth (2005)
 What's Buzzin' Buzzard (1943)
 What's Cookin'? (1947)
 What's Cookin' Doc? (1944)
 What's Cooking? (2000)
 What's Eating Gilbert Grape (1993)
 What's Going On up There? (2006)
 What's Good for the Goose (1969)
 What's His Name (1914)
 What's Love Got to Do with It (1993)
 What's My Lion? (1961)
 What's New About Love? (2011)
 What's New Pussycat? (1965)
 What's a Nice Girl Like You...? (1971)
 What's a Nice Girl like You Doing in a Place like This? (1963)
 What's Opera, Doc? (1957)
 What's Sauce for the Goose (1916)
 What's So Bad About Feeling Good? (1968)
 What's Up with Love? (2002)
 What's Up Nurse! (1977)
 What's Up Superdoc! (1978)
 What's Up, Doc?: (1950 & 1972)
 What's Up, Tiger Lily? (1966)
 What's a Wife Worth? (1921)
 What's the Worst That Could Happen? (2001)
 What's Worth While? (1921)
 What's Wrong with Nanette? (1929)
 What's Wrong with the Women? (1922)
 What's Your Hurry? (1920)
 What's Your Husband Doing? (1920)
 What's Your Number? (2011)
 What's Your Raashee? (2009)
 What's Your Reputation Worth? (1921)
 What? (1972)
 Whatever Happened to Harold Smith? (1999)
 Whatever It Takes: (2000 & 2009 TV)
 Whatever Works (2009)

Whe

 Wheat (2009)
 The Wheel: (1925 & 2021)
 Wheel of Ashes (1968)
 Wheel of Chance (1928)
 Wheel of Fate (1953)
 Wheel of Fortune and Fantasy (2021)
 Wheel of Time (2003)
 Wheelman (2017)
 Wheels (1998)
 Wheels of Fire (1985)
 Wheels on Meals (1984)
 Wheels of Terror (1990 TV)
 When Abortion Was Illegal: Untold Stories (1992)
 When Ali Came to Ireland (2012)
 When AIDS Was Funny (2015)
 When Andrew Came Home (2000)
 When Angels Come to Town (2004 TV)
 When Angels Fall (1959)
 When Angels Fly (1983 TV)
 When Animals Dream (2014)
 When Asia Speaks (1944)
 When Bearcat Went Dry (1919)
 When Billie Beat Bobby (2001) 
 When Björk Met Attenborough (2013)
 When Black Birds Fly (2015)
 When Boris Met Dave (2009)
 When Boys Fly (2002)
 When Brendan Met Trudy (2000)
 When the Cat's Away: (1929 & 1996)
 When China Met Africa (2010)
 When Danger Calls (1927)
 When Darkness Falls: (1960 & 2006)
 When Day Breaks (2012)
 When Dinosaurs Ruled the Earth (1971)
 When Do We Eat?: (1918 & 2005)
 When Eight Bells Toll (1971)
 When the Evening Bells Ring: (1930 & 1951)
 When Evening Falls on Bucharest or Metabolism (2013)
 When Father Was Away on Business (1985)
 When the Game Stands Tall (2014)
 When Harry Met Sally... (1989)
 When I Fall in Love... with Both (2000)
 When Knighthood Was in Flower (1922)
 When Larry Met Mary (2016)
 When the Last Sword Is Drawn (2003)
 When Lincoln Paid (1913)
 When a Man Loves a Woman (1994)
 When a Man Sees Red: (1917 & 1934)
 When Marnie Was There (2014)
 When the Meteor Shot Across the Sky (2016)
 When Night Falls: (1985 & 2012)
 When Night Is Falling (1995)
 When in Rome: (1952, 2002 & 2010)
 When Saturday Comes (1996)
 When a Stranger Calls: (1979 & 2006)
 When a Stranger Calls Back (1993) (TV)
 When Strangers Marry: (1933 & 1944)
 When Taekwondo Strikes (1973)
 When Time Ran Out (1980)
 When the Trees Were Tall (1961)
 When Trumpets Fade (1998 TV)
 When We First Met (2018)
 When We Were Kings (1997)
 When Will I Be Loved (2004)
 When the Wind Blows: (1930 & 1986)
 When Wise Ducks Meet (1924)
 When a Woman Ascends the Stairs (1960)
 When Worlds Collide (1951)
 When You Finish Saving the World (2022)
 When You're in Love (1937)
 When's Your Birthday? (1937)
 Where Angels Fear to Tread (1991)
 Where Angels Go, Trouble Follows (1968)
 Where Are My Children? (1916)
 Where Are We Going, Dad? (2014)
 Where Are We Going, Dad? 2 (2015)
 Where the Boys Are (1960)
 Where the Boys Are '84 (1984)
 Where the Buffalo Roam (1980)
 Where the Crawdads Sing (2022)
 Where Danger Lives (1950)
 Where Do We Go Now? (2011)
 Where Eagles Dare (1968)
 Where Eskimos Live (2002)
 Where the Green Ants Dream (1984)
 Where the Heart Is: (1990 & 2000)
 Where Is the Friend's Home? (1987)
 Where the Lilies Bloom (1974)
 Where the Money Is (2000)
 Where No Vultures Fly (1951)
 Where the Rivers Flow North (1993)
 Where the Sidewalk Ends (1950)
 Where There's Life (1947)
 Where There's a Will: (1936 & 1955)
 Where the Truth Lies (2005)
 Where the Wild Things Are (2009)
 Where'd You Go, Bernadette (2019)
 Where's the Dragon? (2015)

Whi

 Which Is Witch (1948)
 Which Way to the Front? (1970)
 Which Way Is Up? (1977)
 Which Woman? (1918)
 Whichever Way the Ball Bounces (1974)
 While the Attorney Is Asleep (1945)
 While the Billy Boils (1921)
 While the Children Sleep (2007 TV)
 While the City Sleeps: (1928, 1950 & 1956)
 While the Door Was Locked (1946)
 While I Live (1947)
 While I Run This Race (1967)
 While I Was Gone (2004 TV)
 While Justice Waits (1922)
 While London Sleeps (1926)
 While Mexico Sleeps (1938)
 While New York Sleeps: (1920 & 1938)
 While No One Is Watching (2013)
 While Parents Sleep (1935)
 While Paris Sleeps: (1923 & 1932)
 While the Patient Slept (1935)
 While Satan Sleeps (1922)
 While She Was Out (2009)
 While the Sun Shines (1947)
 While There is Still Time (1943)
 While There's Life (1913)
 While There's War There's Hope (1974)
 While We're Young (2014)
 While You Were Sleeping (1995)
 While the Women Are Sleeping (2016)
 Whimsical Illusions (1909)
 The Whip and the Body (1963)
 Whip It (2009)
 Whiplash: (1948, 1959 & 2014)
 Whipped (2000)
 Whipsaw (1935)
 Whirl of Youth (1928)
 Whirlpool: (1934, 1949 & 1959)
 Whirlpool of Desire (1935)
 Whirlwind: (1941, 1951, 1953, 1964 & 1988)
 The Whirlwind (1933)
 Whirlwind of Paris (1939)
 Whiskey Business (2012 TV)
 Whiskey School (2005)
 Whiskey Tango Foxtrot (2016)
 Whisky (2004)
 Whisky Galore!: (1949 & 2016)
 Whisky Is Risky (2014)
 Whisky Romeo Zulu (2005)
 Whisper (2007)
 Whisper of the Heart (1995)
 Whisper If I Forget (2014)
 Whisper with the Wind (2009)
 The Whisperers (1966)
 Whispering Canyon (1926)
 Whispering City (1947)
 Whispering Corridors (1998)
 Whispering Footsteps (1943)
 Whispering Ghosts (1942)
 Whispering Sage (1927)
 Whispering Sands (2001)
 Whispering Smith (1948)
 Whispering Smith Hits London (1952)
 Whispering Smith Speaks (1935)
 The Whispering Star (2015)
 Whispering Tongues (1934)
 Whispering Whoopee (1930)
 Whispering Winds (1929)
 Whispering Wires (1926)
 Whispers in the Dark (1992)
 Whispers: An Elephant's Tale (2000)
 Whistle: (2003 & 2013)
 The Whistle (1921)
 Whistle Blower (2014)
 The Whistle Blower (1986)
 Whistle Down the Wind (1961)
 The Whistle at Eaton Falls (1951)
 Whistle and I'll Come to You: (1968 TV & 2010 TV)
 Whistle Stop: (1946 & 1963)
 The Whistleblower (2010)
 The Whistler (1944)
 The Whistlers (2019)
 Whistlin' Dan (1932)
 Whistling in Brooklyn (1943)
 Whistling in the Dark: (1933 & 1941)
 Whistling in Dixie (1942)
 Whistling Hills (1951)
 Whistling Smith (1975)
 White (2016)
 White Acacia (1957)
 White Angel (1994)
 White Ant (2016)
 White Apache (1986)
 White Badge (1992)
 White Banners (1938)
 The White Buffalo (1977)
 White Chicks (2004)
 White Christmas (1954)
 The White Cliffs of Dover (1944)
 White Corridors (1951)
 The White Countess (2006)
 The White Crow: (1980 & 2018)
 White Dog (1982)
 The White Dove: (1920, 1942 & 1960)
 White Fang: (1936, 1973, 1991 & 2018)
 White Fang 2: Myth of the White Wolf (1994)
 White Fawn's Devotion (1910)
 White Fire (1984)
 White God (2014)
 The White God (1932)
 White Hair Devil Lady (1980)
 The White Haired Witch of Lunar Kingdom (2014)
 White Heat (1949)
 The White Horse Inn: (1926, 1935, 1952 & 1960)
 White House Down (2013)
 White Hunter Black Heart (1990)
 White Irish Drinkers (2010)
 The White King (2016)
 White Lie (2019)
 White Lightnin' (2009)
 White Lightning: (1953 & 1973)
 White Line Fever (1975)
 White Man's Burden (1995)
 White Material (2009)
 White Men Can't Jump (1992)
 White Mischief (1987)
 White Night: (2009, 2012 & 2017)
 White Night Wedding (2008)
 White Nights: (1916, 1957, 1959 & 1985)
 White Noise: (2005, 2020 & 2022)
 White Noise: The Light (2007)
 White Oleander (2002)
 White Palace (1990)
 The White Parade (1934)
 White Paradise: (1924, 1929 & 2022)
 The White Reindeer (1952)
 The White Ribbon (2009)
 White Sands (1992)
 White Savage (1943)
 White Settlers (2014)
 The White Sheik (1952)
 The White Sister: (1915, 1923, 1933 & 1960)
 White Skin (2004)
 White Snake (2019)
 White Snake 2: The Tribulation of the Green Snake (2021)
 White as Snow (2010)
 White Squall (1996)
 White Sun of the Desert (1969)
 The White Tiger (2021)
 The White Wall (1975)
 The White Waltz (1943)
 White Wilderness (1958)
 White Woman (1933)
 White Zombie (1932)
 A White, White Day (2019)
 White: Melody of Death (2011)
 Whiteboyz (1999)
 Whiteout: (2000 & 2009)
 Whitewash (1994) TV
 Whitewash (2013)

Who

 Who Am I?: (1998, 2009 & 2014)
 Who Am I 2015 (2015)
 Who Am I This Time? (1982)
 Who Are the DeBolts? And Where Did They Get Nineteen Kids? (1977) 
 Who Bombed Judi Bari (2012)
 Who Can Kill a Child? (1978)
 Who Is Cletis Tout? (2001)
 Who Dares Wins (1982)
 Who Do You Love? (2008)
 Who Does She Think She Is (2008)
 Who Done It?: (1942, 1949 & 1956)
 Who Framed Roger Rabbit (1988)
 Who Gets the Dog? (2016)
 Who Goes Next? (1938)
 Who Goes There! (1952)
 Who Has Seen the Wind (1977)
 Who Has Seen the Wind? (1965)
 Who Is Harry Kellerman and Why Is He Saying Those Terrible Things About Me? (1971)
 Who Invented Divorce? (1928)
 Who Killed Captain Alex? (2010)
 Who Killed Doc Robbin (1948)
 Who Killed the Electric Car? (2006)
 Who Killed Santa Claus? (1941)
 Who Looks for Gold? (1974)
 Who Moved My Dream (2014)
 Who Never Lived (2006)
 Who Sleeps My Bro (2016)
 Who is Undercover (2014)
 Who We Love (2021)
 Who You Think I Am (2019)
 Who'll Stop the Rain (1978)
 Who's Afraid of Virginia Woolf? (1966)
 Who's Been Sleeping in My Bed? (1963)
 Who's Boss? (1914)
 Who's Cookin' Who? (1946)
 Who's Counting? Marilyn Waring on Sex, Lies and Global Economics (1995)
 Who's Driving Doug (2016)
 Who's Gonna Love Me Now? (2016)
 Who's Got the Action? (1962)
 Who's Harry Crumb? (1989)
 Who's Kissing Madeleine? (1939)
 Who's Minding the Mint? (1967)
 Who's Minding the Store? (1963)
 Who's My Favourite Girl (1999)
 Who's Quentin? (2005)
 Who's Singin' Over There? (1980)
 Who's That Girl (1987)
 Who's That Knocking at My Door (1967)
 Who's That Soldier? (1987)
 Who's Who in Animal Land (1944)
 Who's Who In The Wrestling World - And Why? (1927)
 Who's Who in the Zoo (1942)
 Who's Your Caddy? (2007)
 Who's Your Daddy? (2002)
 The Whole Nine Yards (2000)
 The Whole Ten Yards (2004)
 The Whole Town's Talking: (1926 & 1935)
 The Whole Truth: (1923, 1958 & 2016)
 The Whole Wide World (1996)
 Wholesale Souls Inc. (2006)
 The Whoopee Boys (1986)
 Whoopee! (1930)
 Whore: (1991, 2004 & 2008)
 The Whore: (2009 & 2010 TV)
 Whores' Glory (2011)

Why

 Why? (1987)
 Why Be Good? (1929)
 Why Beauty Matters (2009)
 Why Bring That Up? (1929)
 Why Can't We Be a Family Again? (2002)
 Why Change Your Wife? (1920)
 Why Cheat India (2019)
 Why the Cuckoo Cries (1967)
 Why Cry at Parting? (1929)
 Why Did I Ever Say Yes Twice? (1969)
 Why Did I Get Married? (2007)
 Why Did I Get Married Too? (2010)
 Why Didn't Anybody Tell Me It Would Become This Bad in Afghanistan (2007) 
 Why Do Fools Fall in Love (1998)
 Why Do These Kids Love School? (1999)
 Why Do They Call It Love When They Mean Sex? (1993)
 Why Does Herr R. Run Amok? (1970)
 Why Don't You Play in Hell? (2013)
 Why Get a Divorce? (1926)
 Why Girls Go Back Home (1926)
 Why Girls Leave Home: (1921 & 1945)
 Why Girls Love Sailors (1927)
 Why Girls Say No (1927)
 Why Has Bodhi-Dharma Left for the East? (1989)
 Why He Gave Up (1911)
 Why Him? (2016)
 Why Horror? (2014)
 Why I Wore Lipstick to My Mastectomy (2006)
 Why I Would Not Marry? (1918)
 Why Is the Crow Black-Coated (1956)
 Why Korea? (1950)
 Why Leave Home? (1929)
 Why Man Creates (1968)
 Why Me?: (1978, 1984, 1985, 1990 & 2015)
 Why Me, Sweetie?! (2003)
 Why Men Don't Listen and Women Can't Read Maps (2007)
 Why Men Leave Home (1924)
 Why Men Work (1924)
 Why Must I Die? (1960)
 Why Not Me? (1999)
 Why Pick on Me?: (1918 & 1937)
 Why Rock the Boat? (1974)
 Why Sailors Go Wrong (1928)
 Why Sailors Leave Home (1930)
 Why She Would Not (1950)
 Why the Sheriff Is a Bachelor (1914)
 Why Shoot the Teacher? (1977)
 Why Smith Left Home (1919)
 Why Stop Now (2012)
 Why the Swallow Has the Tail with Little Horns (1967)
 Why That Actor Was Late (1908)
 Why Wal-Mart Works; and Why That Drives Some People C-R-A-Z-Y (2005)
 Why We Bang (2006)
 Why We Fight (2005)
 Why We Laugh: Black Comedians on Black Comedy (2009)
 Why Women Love (1925)
 Why Worry? (1923)
 Why Would I Lie? (1980)
 Whys and Other Whys (1927)

Wi

Wib–Wic

 Wibbel the Tailor: (1920, 1931 & 1939)
 Wichita (1955)
 Wicked: (1931, 1998 & 2021)
 The Wicked: (1991 & 2013)
 Wicked Blood (2014)
 The Wicked Carabel (1935)
 Wicked City: (1949 & 1987)
 The Wicked City (1992)
 The Wicked Darling (1919)
 The Wicked Dreams of Paula Schultz (1968)
 A Wicked Ghost (1999)
 A Wicked Ghost II: The Fear (2000)
 A Wicked Ghost III: The Possession (2002) 
 The Wicked Lady: (1945 & 1983)
 Wicked Little Things (2006)
 Wicked Spring (2002)
 Wicked Stepmother (1989)
 A Wicked Tale (2005)
 Wicked as They Come (1956)
 Wicked, Wicked (1973)
 Wicked Woman (1953)
 A Wicked Woman (1934)
 Wickedness Preferred (1928)
 The Wicker Man: (1973 & 2006)
 Wicker Park (2004)
 The Wicker Tree (2011)
 The Wickham Mystery (1931)

Wid

 Wide Awake: (1998 & 2007)
 The Wide Blue Road (1957)
 Wide Blue Yonder (2010)
 Wide-Eyed and Legless (1993)
 Wide Open (1930)
 Wide Open Faces (1938)
 Wide Open Spaces: (1924 & 1947)
 Wide Open Town (1941)
 Wide Sargasso Sea: (1993 & 2006)
 Widecombe Fair (1928)
 Wideo Wabbit (1956)
 The Widow: (1939 & 1955)
 The Widow Casey's Return (1912)
 The Widow from Chicago (1930)
 The Widow Couderc (1971)
 The Widow from Monte Carlo (1935)
 The Widow of Montiel (1979)
 The Widow of Saint-Pierre (2000)
 The Widow in Scarlet (1932)
 Widow of Silence (2018)
 The Widow's Ball (1930)
 The Widow's Investment (1914)
 Widow's Might (1935)
 The Widow's Might: (1918 & 2009)
 The Widowhood of Karolina Žašler (1976)
 The Widowmaker (1990 TV)
 Widows: (1976, 2011 & 2018)
 The Widows of Thursdays (2009)
 Widows' Peak (1994)
 The Width of the Pavement (1956)

Wie–Wig

 Wie die Karnickel (2002)
 Wie die Wilden (1959 TV)
 Wiebo's War (2011)
 Wielka droga (1946)
 Wiener-Dog (2016)
 Wiener Takes All: A Dogumentary (2007)
 Wieners (2008)
 Wierna rzeka: (1936 & 1983)
 Wife (1953)
 The Wife: (1995 & 2017)
 Wife Against Wife (1921)
 Wife and Auto Trouble (1916)
 The Wife of the Centaur (1924)
 A Wife Confesses (1961)
 Wife or Country (1918)
 A Wife in Danger (1939)
 Wife, Doctor and Nurse (1937)
 The Wife of Forty Years (1925)
 The Wife of General Ling (1937)
 The Wife He Bought (1918)
 Wife, Husband and Friend (1939)
 The Wife of an Important Man (1988)
 The Wife of Monte Cristo (1946)
 Wife, Mother, Murderer (1991)
 Wife in Name Only (1923)
 Wife for a Night (1952)
 Wife Number 13 (1962)
 Wife Number Two (1917)
 A Wife from Paris (1966)
 Wife Savers (1928)
 Wife of a Spy (2020 TV)
 The Wife Swappers (1970)
 The Wife Takes a Flyer (1942)
 Wife Tamers (1926)
 A Wife or Two (1936)
 Wife vs. Secretary (1936)
 Wife Wanted: (1915 & 1946)
 The Wife Who Wasn't Wanted (1925)
 The Wife's Family (1931)
 A Wife's Heart (1956)
 A Wife's Life (1950)
 The Wife's Relations (1928)
 A Wife's Sacrifice (1916)
 The Wig: (1925 & 2005)
 Wiggle Your Ears (1929)
 The Wiggles Movie (1997)
 Wigilia (2014)
 Wigstock: The Movie (1995)

Wil–Wim

 Wilaya (2011)
 Wilbur Wants to Kill Himself (2002)
 The Wilby Conspiracy (1975)
 Wilby Wonderful (2004)
 The Wild (2006)
 The Wild Affair (1965)
 Wild America (1997)
 The Wild Angels (1966)
 A Wild Ass of a Man (1980 TV)
 The Wild Bees (2001)
 Wild Bill: (1995 & 2011)
 The Wild Blue Yonder: (1951 & 2005)
 Wild Boy (1952)
 The Wild Bunch (1969)
 The Wild Bunch: An Album in Montage (1996)
 Wild Cactus (1993)
 Wild Card: (2003 & 2015)
 The Wild Cat (1921)
 The Wild Chase (1965)
 The Wild Child (1970)
 Wild Combination: A Portrait of Arthur Russell (2008)
 The Wild Country (1970)
 Wild in the Country (1961)
 Wild Dogs (1985)
 The Wild Dogs (2002)
 The Wild Duck (1984)
 The Wild East (1993)
 The Wild Eye (1967)
 The Wild Flower and the Rose (1910)
 The Wild Frontier (1947)
 The Wild Geese: (1953 & 1978)
 Wild Geese II (1985)
 The Wild Girl (1917)
 The Wild Girl (1925)
 The Wild Goose (1921)
 The Wild Goose Chase: (1915 & 1932)
 The Wild Goose Lake (2019)
 The Wild Goose on the Wing (1979)
 Wild Grass (2009)
 Wild Guitar (1962)
 A Wild Hare (1940)
 Wild at Heart (1990)
 Wild Hogs (2007)
 Wild Horse (1931)
 The Wild Horse Stampede (1926)
 Wild Horses: (1985 TV, 1995 & 2015)
 The Wild Hunt (2009)
 Wild Indian (2021)
 Wild Is the Wind (1957)
 The Wild Life (1984)
 Wild Life: (2011 & 2014)
 The Wild Man of Borneo (1941)
 The Wild Man of the Navidad (2008)
 The Wild McCullochs (1975)
 Wild Mountain Thyme (2020)
 The Wild One (1953)
 The Wild Ones (2012)
 Wild Orchid (1989)
 Wild Orchid II: Two Shades of Blue (1991)
 Wild Orchids (1929)
 The Wild Parrots of Telegraph Hill (2005)
 The Wild Party: (1923, 1929, 1956 & 1975)
 The Wild Pear Tree (2018)
 Wild Reeds (1995)
 The Wild Ride (1960)
 Wild River (1960)
 The Wild Sea (1969)
 Wild Side (1995 & 2004)
 Wild Strawberries (1957)
 Wild in the Streets (1968)
 Wild Tales (2014)
 Wild Target (2010)
 Wild Things series:
 Wild Things (1998)
 Wild Things 2 (2004)
 Wild Things: Diamonds in the Rough (2005)
 Wild Things: Foursome (2010)
 The Wild Thornberrys Movie (2002)
 Wild Tigers I Have Known (2006)
 The Wild, Wild Rose (1960)
 Wild Wild West (1999)
 Wild Women of Wongo (1958)
 Wild and Woolly: (1917, 1932 & 1937)
 Wild and Wonderful (1964)
 The Wild and Wonderful Whites of West Virginia (2009)
 The Wild, Wild World of Jayne Mansfield (1968)
 The Wild and Wycked World of Brian Jones (2005)
 Wild Zero (2000)
The Wildcat: (1917 & 1936)
 Wildcats (1986)
 Wilde (1997)
 Wilde Salomé (2011)
 Wilder Napalm (1993)
 Wilderness: (2006 & 2017)
 Wildlife (2018)
 Wildling (2018)
 Will: (1981 & 2011)
 The Will: (1921, 1939 & 2020)
 Will Any Gentleman...? (1953)
 A Will of Her Own (1915)
 Will Penny (1968)
 Will Success Spoil Rock Hunter? (1957)
 A Will and a Way (1922)
 Will: G. Gordon Liddy (1982 TV)
 Willard: (1971 & 2003)
 William Shakespeare's Romeo + Juliet (1996)
 Willie Dynamite (1974)
 The Willoughbys (2020)
 Willow: (1988 & 2019)
 Willow Creek (2013)
 Willow and Wind (2000)
 Willy Wonka & the Chocolate Factory (1971)
 Willy's Wonderland (2021)
 Wilson: (1944 & 2017)
 Wimbledon (2004)

Win

 Win! (2016)
 Win a Date with Tad Hamilton! (2004)
 Win It All (2017)
 Win That Girl (1928)
 Win Win (2011)
 Win, Lose and Kaboom (2004)
 Winchell (1998)
 Winchester '73 (1950)
 Winchester: The House That Ghosts Built (2018)
 Wind (1992)
 The Wind: (1928, 1982 & 1986)
 Wind Across the Everglades (1958)
 Wind Chill (2007)
 Wind Echoing in My Being (1997)
 Wind in the Face (1930)
 The Wind and the Lion (1975)
 Wind Over Water (2003)
 The Wind Rises (2013)
 Wind River (2017)
 The Wind That Shakes the Barley (2006)
 The Wind Will Carry Us (1999)
 Wind in the Willows (1988)
 The Wind in the Willows: (1983, 1987, 1995, 1996 & 2006 TV)
 Wind in the Wire (1993)
 Windaria (1986)
 Windbag the Sailor (1936)
 Windfall: (1935, 1955 & 2010)
 Windhorse (1998)
 The Winding Road (1920)
 The Winding Stair (1925)
 Windjammer: (1930, 1937 & 1958)
 The Windmill (1937)
 The Windmill Massacre (2016)
 Windom's Way (1957)
 The Window: (1949 & 1970)
 The Window Cleaner (1968)
 Window Cleaners (1940)
 Window Connection (2014)
 Window Horses (2016)
 A Window in London (1940)
 A Window in Piccadilly (1928)
 Window Water Baby Moving (1959)
 A Window on Washington Park (1913)
 Windows (1980)
 The Winds of the Aures (1967)
 The Winds of Kitty Hawk (1978 TV)
 Winds of the Pampas (1927)
 Winds of September (2008)
 Winds of the Wasteland (1936)
 Windsor Drive (2015)
 Windstorm (2013)
 Windstruck (2004)
 Windtalkers (2002)
 Windwalker (1981)
 Windy City (1984) 
 Windy City Heat (2003)
 Wine: (1913 & 1924)
 Wine Cellars (1930)
 Wine Country (2019) 
 Wine of Morning (1955)
 Wine Road of the Samurai (2006)
 Wine, Women and Horses (1937)
 Wine, Women and Song (1933)
 Wine of Youth (1924)
 Wing Chun (1994)
 Wing Commander (1999)
 A Wing and a Prayer (2015)
 Winged Migration (2001)
 The Wings (1916)
 Wings: (1927, 1966 & 2012)
 Wings of Courage (1995)
 Wings of Desire (1987)
 The Wings of the Dove: (1981 & 1997)
 The Wings of Eagles (1957)
 Wings of Honneamise (1995)
 The Winner: (1926, 1962, 1996, 2011, 2014 & 2016)
 A Winner Never Quits (1986 TV)
 Winners and Sinners (1983)
 Winnie the Pooh series:
 Winnie the Pooh and the Honey Tree (1966)
 Winnie the Pooh and the Blustery Day (1968)
 Winnie the Pooh and Tigger Too! (1974)
 The Many Adventures of Winnie the Pooh (1977)
 Winnie the Pooh and a Day for Eeyore (1983)
 Pooh's Grand Adventure: The Search for Christopher Robin (1997)
 Winnie the Pooh: Seasons of Giving (1999)
 The Tigger Movie (2000)
 Piglet's Big Movie (2003)
 Winnie the Pooh: Springtime with Roo (2004)
 Pooh's Heffalump Movie (2005)
 Pooh's Heffalump Halloween Movie (2005)
 Winnie the Pooh (2011)
 Winnie-the-Pooh: Blood and Honey (TBD)
 Winning (1969)
 Winning London (2001)
 The Winslow Boy: (1948 & 1999)
 Winstanley (1975)
 Winter: (1930, 2002 & 2009)
 The Winter (2016)
 Winter 1960 (1983)
 Winter A-Go-Go (1965)
 Winter Brothers (2017)
 Winter Buoy (2015)
 Winter Carnival (1939)
 Winter Cherry (1985)
 A Winter of Cyclists (2013)
 Winter Days (2003)
 Winter of Discontent (2012)
 Winter Evening in Gagra (1985)
 Winter on Fire: Ukraine's Fight for Freedom (2015)
 Winter Flies (2018)
 Winter of Frozen Dreams (2009)
 The Winter Guest (1997)
 Winter Holidays (1959)
 Winter in the Blood (2013)
 Winter in Rio (2002)
 Winter in Tokyo (2016)
 Winter in Wartime (2008)
 Winter in the Woods: (1936 & 1956)
 Winter Journey: (2006 & 2013)
 Winter Kept Us Warm (1965)
 Winter Kill (1974 TV)
 Winter Kills (1979)
 Winter Light (1963)
 Winter Meeting (1948)
 Winter Night's Dream (1935)
 Winter of Our Dreams (1981)
 Winter Passing (2006)
 Winter People (1989)
 Winter Ridge (2018)
 A Winter Rose (2016)
 Winter Sleep (2014)
 Winter Sleepers (1997)
 Winter Soldier (1972)
 Winter Solstice (2004)
 Winter Storage (1949)
 Winter Stories (1999)
 Winter Storms (1924)
 A Winter Tale (2007)
 A Winter Tan (1987)
 Winter Vacation (2010)
 Winter Visitor (2008)
 The Winter War (1989)
 Winter Woman (1977)
 Winter Wonderland (1946)
 Winter's Bone (2010)
 Winter's Night (2018)
 Winter's Tale (2014)
 Winterborn (1978)
 Winterhawk (1975)
 Winterset (1936)
 Winterspelt (1979)
 Wintertime (1943)

Wir–Wis

 Wir Wunderkinder (1958)
 Wira (2019)
 Wired (1989)
 The Wireless Wire-Walkers (1921)
 Wiren (2018)
 Wire Room (2022)
 Wiretapper (1955)
 Wisconsin Death Trip (1999)
 Wisdom (1986)
 The Wisdom of Crocodiles (2000)
 Wisdom of the Pretzel (2002)
 The Wisdom Tree (2013)
 Wise Blood (1979)
 A Wise Fool (1921)
 Wise Girl (1937)
 Wise Girls (1929)
 The Wise Guy (1926)
 Wise Guys: (1961 & 1986)
 The Wise Guys (1965)
 The Wise Kid (1922)
 The Wise Kids (2011)
 The Wise Little Hen (1934)
 Wise Quackers (1949)
 The Wise Quacking Duck (1943)
 Wise Quacks  (1939)
 The Wise Wife (1927)
 WiseGirls (2002)
 The Wiser Sex (1932)
 Wish (2013)
 Wish For Tomorrow (2015)
 Wish I Was Here (2014)
 Wish I Were a Shark (1999)
 Wish Me Away (2011)
 Wish Me Luck (2001)
 Wish Upon (2017)
 Wish upon a Pike (1938)
 Wish Upon a Star (1996 TV)
 Wish You Happy Breakup (2016)
 Wish You Well (2013)
 Wish You Were Here: (1987, 2012 & 2013)
 The Wishbone (1933)
 Wishbone's Dog Days of the West (1998)
 Wishcraft (2002)
 Wished (2017)
 Wished on Mabel (1915)
 Wishful Thinking (1997)
 Wishin' and Hopin' (2014)
 The Wishing Ring: An Idyll of Old England (1914)
 The Wishing Ring Man (1919)
 Wishing Stairs (2003)
 The Wishing-Table (1956)
 The Wishing Tree (1977)
 Wishmaster series:
 Wishmaster (1997)
 Wishmaster 2: Evil Never Dies (1999)
 Wishmaster 3: Beyond the Gates of Hell (2001)
 Wishmaster: The Prophecy Fulfilled (2002)
 The Wiskottens (1926)
 The Wistful Widow of Wagon Gap (1947)

Wit

 Wit (2001 TV)
 Wit Nyin Ka Kyoe (2017)
 The Witch: (1906, 1916, 1954 & 2015)
 Witch Academy (1995)
 Witch Crafty (1955)
 Witch Doctor (2016)
 Witch Hunt: (1994, 1999 TV & 2019)
 The Witch Hunt (1981)
 Witch from Nepal (1986)
 Witch Story (1989)
 Witch Way Love (1997)
 The Witch Who Came from the Sea (1976)
 A Witch Without a Broom (1967)
 The Witch's Cradle (1944)
 The Witch's Mirror (1962)
 A Witch's Tangled Hare (1959)
 Witchblade (2000 TV)
 Witchboard (1986)
 Witchboard 2: The Devil's Doorway (1993)
 Witchboard III: The Possession (1995)
 Witchcraft: (1916 & 1964)
 Witchcraft series:
 Witchcraft (1988)
 Witchcraft II: The Temptress (1990)
 Witchcraft III: The Kiss of Death (1991)
 Witchcraft IV: The Virgin Heart (1992)
 Witchcraft V: Dance with the Devil (1993)
 Witchcraft VI: The Devil's Mistress (1994)
 Witchcraft VII: Judgement Hour (1995)
 Witchcraft VIII: Salem's Ghost (1996)
 Witchcraft IX: Bitter Flesh (1997)
 Witchcraft X: Mistress of the Craft (1998)
 Witchcraft XI: Sisters in Blood (2000)
 Witchcraft XII: In the Lair of the Serpent (2002)
 Witchcraft XIII: Blood of the Chosen (2008)
 Witchcraft XIV: Angel of Death (2016)
 Witchcraft XV: Blood Rose (2016)
 Witchcraft XVI: Hollywood Coven (2016)
 The Witcher (2001)
 The Witcher: Nightmare of the Wolf (2021)
 Witchery (1988)
 The Witches: (1966, 1967, 1990 & 2020)
 Witches of the Caribbean (2005)
 The Witches Cave (1989)
 The Witches of Eastwick (1987)
 The Witches Mountain (1972)
 Witches to the North (2001)
 Witches' Brew (1980)
 Witches' Night: (1927 & 1937)
 Witchfinder General (1968)
 Witchhammer (1970)
 Witching & Bitching (2013)
 The Witching Hour: (1921, 1934 & 1985)
 Witchouse (1999)
 Witchville (2010 TV)
 Witchy Pretty Cure! The Movie: Wonderous! Cure Mofurun! (2016)
 With All Her Heart (1920)
 With Babies and Banners: Story of the Women's Emergency Brigade (1979)
 With Beauty and Sorrow (1965)
 With Broken Wings (1938)
 With Buffalo Bill on the U. P. Trail (1926)
 With Byrd at the South Pole (1930)
 With Children at the Seaside (1972)
 With a Friend Like Harry... (2000)
 With Honors (1994)
 With Six You Get Eggroll (1968)
 Within (2016)
 Within Our Gates (1920)
 Within the Woods (1979)
 Withnail and I (1987)
 Without (2011)
 Without Anesthesia (1978)
 Without a Clue (1988)
 Without Honor: (1932 & 1949)
 Without Limits (1998)
 Without Love (1945)
 Without a Paddle (2004)
 Without Remorse (2021)
 Without Warning: (1980 & 1994)
 Without Warning: The James Brady Story (1991 TV)
 Witless Protection (2008)
 Witness: (1985 & 1988)
 The Witness: (1969 French, 1969 Hungarian, 1992, 2000, 2012, 2015 American, 2015 Chinese & 2018)
 Witness in the Dark (1959)
 Witness to the Execution (1994)
 Witness to Murder (1954)
 Witness for the Prosecution: (1957 & 1982 TV)
 Witnesses (2003)
 The Witty Sorcerer (1931)

Wiv–Wiz

 Wives at Auction (1926)
 The Wives He Forgot (2006)
 The Wives of Jamestown (1913)
 Wives and Lovers (1963)
 Wives of Men (1918)
 Wives Never Know (1936)
 Wives and Obscurities (1956)
 Wives and Other Wives (1918)
 Wives on Strike (2016)
 Wives – Ten Years After (1985)
 Wives Under Suspicion (1938)
 A Wives' Tale (1980)
 The Wiz (1978)
 The Wizard: (1927 & 1989)
 The Wizard of Baghdad (1960)
 The Wizard of Gore: (1970 & 2007)
 The Wizard of Lies (2017 TV)
 The Wizard of Loneliness (1988)
 The Wizard of Oz: (1925, 1933, 1939, 1950 TV & 1982)
 Wizard of Space and Time (1989)
 The Wizard of Speed and Time (1989)
 The Wizard of Stone Mountain (2011)
 The Wizard of the Strings (1985)
 Wizards (1977)
 Wizards of the Demon Sword (1991)
 Wizards of the Lost Kingdom (1985)
 Wizards of the Lost Kingdom II (1989)
 Wizards of Waverly Place: The Movie (2009 TV)
 A Wizard's Tale (2018)
 Wizard's Way (2013)
 Wizja lokalna 1901 (1981)

Wk
 wkw/tk/1996@7'55"hk.net (1996)

Wo

 Wo Ai Ni Mommy (2010)
 Wo Du hin gehst (1957)
 Wo Hu (2006)
 Wo der Zug nicht lange hält... (1960)

Wob–Wok

 Wobble Palace (2018)
 Woe to the Young (1961)
 The Woes of Roller Skaters (1908)
 The Wog Boy (2000)
 Wog Boy 2: Kings of Mykonos (2010)
 Woh Chokri (1994)
 Woh Din Yaad Karo (1971)
 Woh Jo Hasina (1983)
 Woh Kaun Thi? (1964)
 Woh Lamhe (2006)
 Woh Main Nahin (1974)
 Woh Phir Aayegi (1988)
 Woh Saat Din (1983)
 Woh Tera Naam Tha (2004)
 Wohi Raat Wohi Awaaz (1973)
 Wohin? (1988)
 Wojaczek (1999)
 Wojewoda (1912)
 Woke Up Like This (2017)

Wol

 The Wold Shadow (1972)
 Wolf: (1955, 1994, 2013, 2021 Indian & 2021 Irish-Polish)
 The Wolf: (1916, 1949 & 2004)
 Wolf Blood (1925)
 Wolf Children (2012)
 Wolf Creek (2005)
 Wolf Creek 2 (2013)
 The Wolf of Debt (1915)
 Wolf Devil Woman (1982)
 Wolf Dog (1958)
 The Wolf Dog (1933)
 A Wolf at the Door (2013)
 The Wolf at the Door (1986)
 Wolf Fangs (1927)
 Wolf Girl (2001 TV)
 The Wolf Hunters (1949)
 Wolf Larsen (1958)
 The Wolf and the Lion (2021)
 Wolf Lowry (1917)
 The Wolf Man: (1924 short & 1941)
 The Wolf Men (1969)
 Wolf of New York (1940)
 Wolf Riders (1935)
 Wolf and Sheep (2016)
 The Wolf of the Sila (1949)
 The Wolf of Snow Hollow (2020)
 Wolf Song (1929)
 "Wolf Song: The Movie" (2016)
 Wolf Totem (2015)
 Wolf Tracks (1920)
 Wolf Warriors (2015)
 Wolf Warriors 2 (2017)
 The Wolf of Wall Street: (1929 & 2013)
 The Wolf Woman (1916)
 WolfCop (2014)
 Wolfen (1981)
 Wolfhound: (1991, 2002 & 2006)
 The Wolfman (2010)
 The Wolfpack (2015)
 Wolfwalkers (2020)
 The Wolf's Call (2019)
 Wolf's Clothing: (1927 & 1936)
 Wolf's Hole (1987)
 Wolfsburg (2003)
 "Wolfsong (Short) (2013)
 The Wolverine (2013)
 Wolves: (1930, 1999, 2014 & 2016)
 The Wolves: (1956 & 1971)
 Wolves of the City (1929)
 Wolves Cry Under the Moon (1997)
 Wolves of the Deep (1959)
 Wolves of the Desert (1926)
 Wolves at the Door (2016)
 Wolves Hunt at Night (1952)
 Wolves of the Night (1919)
 Wolves at Our Door (1997)
 Wolves, Pigs and Men (1964)
 Wolves of the Rail (1918)
 Wolves of the Range (1943)
 Wolves and Sheep (1953)
 Wolves of the Street (1920)
 Wolves of Wall Street (2002)
 The Wolves of Willoughby Chase (1989)
 Wolvesbayne (2009)

Wom

 Woman: (1918 & 1968)
 A Woman (1915)
 The Woman: (1915 & 2011)
 The Woman in 47 (1916)
 The Woman Accused (1933)
 The Woman in the Advocate's Gown (1929)
 Woman Against Woman (1938)
 Woman Against the World (1937)
 Woman Basketball Player No. 5 (1957)
 A Woman and the Beancurd Soup (1968)
 The Woman Beneath (1917)
 The Woman from Berlin (1925)
 The Woman Between: (1931 American & 1931 British)
 The Woman Between Friends (1918)
 Woman Between Wolf and Dog (1979)
 The Woman in Black: (1914, 1989 & 2012)
 The Woman in Black: Angel of Death (2014)
 The Woman in Blue (1973)
 Woman Buried Alive (1973)
 The Woman in the Case: (1916 American & 1916 Australian)
 The Woman Chaser (1999)
 Woman Chases Man (1937)
 The Woman from China (1931)
 The Woman with Closed Eyes (1926)
 The Woman Condemned (1934)
 The Woman Conquers (1922)
 The Woman Cop (1980)
 The Woman at the Crossroads: (1919 & 1938)
 The Woman by the Dark Window (1960)
 The Woman Disputed (1928)
 The Woman in Doctor's Garb (1920)
 The Woman Dressed As a Man (1932)
 Woman in a Dressing Gown (1957)
 Woman in the Dunes (1964)
 The Woman Eater (1957)
 The Woman Everyone Loves Is You (1929)
 The Woman in the Fifth (2011)
 Woman of Fire (1971)
 Woman of Fire '82 (1982)
 The Woman in Flames (1924)
 The Woman from the Folies Bergères (1927)
 The Woman Gives (1920)
 The Woman God Changed (1921)
 The Woman God Forgot (1917)
 Woman in Gold (2015)
 The Woman in Gold (1926)
 The Woman in Green (1945)
 Woman in a Hat (1985)
 The Woman Hater: (1910 Powers film, 1910 Thanhouser film & 1925)
 Woman Hater (1948)
 The Woman Haters (1913)
 Woman Haters (1934)
 The Woman He Loved (1988)
 The Woman He Married (1922)
 The Woman in Heaven (1920)
 The Woman from Hell (1929)
 The Woman in His House (1920)
 The Woman Hunt (1972)
 The Woman Hunter (1972)
 The Woman for Joe (1955)
 The Woman Juror (1926)
 The Woman I Love: (1929 & 1937)
 The Woman I Stole (1933)
 The Woman Inside (1981)
 Woman Is the Future of Man (2004)
 The Woman Knight of Mirror Lake (2011)
 The Woman from Last Night (1950)
 A Woman Like You: (1933 & 1939)
 The Woman from Mellon's (1910)
 The Woman Michael Married (1919)
 The Woman at Midnight (1925)
 The Woman from Monte Carlo (1932)
 Woman in the Moon (1929)
 The Woman from Moscow (1928)
 The Woman Next Door: (1915, 1919 & 1981)
 The Woman One Longs For (1929)
 The Woman from the Orient (1923)
 A Woman of Paris (1923)
 The Woman and the Puppet: (1920 & 1929)
 The Woman in Question (1950)
 The Woman Racket (1930)
 A Woman Rebels (1936)
 The Woman in Red: (1935, 1947 & 1984)
 The Woman in Room 13: (1920 & 1932)
 A Woman of the Sea (1926)
 The Woman and the Stranger (1985)
 Woman of Straw (1964)
 The Woman Suffers (1918)
 The Woman from Tangier (1948)
 The Woman Tempted (1926)
 The Woman That Dreamed About a Man (2010)
 Woman They Almost Lynched (1953)
 The Woman They Talk About (1931)
 The Woman Thief (1938)
 Woman Thou Art Loosed (2004)
 The Woman Thou Gavest Me (1919)
 The Woman from Till 12 (1928)
 Women of Today (1936)
 Woman on Top (2000)
 The Woman Under Cover (1919)
 A Woman Under the Influence (1974)
 The Woman Under Oath (1919)
 The Woman Upstairs (1921)
 Woman Walks Ahead (2017)
 The Woman from Warren's (1915)
 The Woman in White: (1912, 1917, 1921, 1929 & 1948)
 The Woman Who Believed (1922)
 The Woman Who Brushed Off Her Tears (2012)
 The Woman Who Came Back (1945)
 The Woman Who Couldn't Say No (1927)
 The Woman Who Dared: (1933 & 1944)
 The Woman Who Desires Sin (1929)
 The Woman Who Did: (1915 & 1925)
 The Woman Who Drinks (2001)
 Woman Who Exposes Herself (1981)
 The Woman Who Gave (1918)
 The Woman Who Invented Love (1952)
 The Woman Who Left (2016)
 The Woman Who Loved Elvis (1993)
 The Woman Who Obeyed (1923)
 The Woman Who Ran (2020)
 The Woman Who Sinned (1991)
 The Woman Who Walked Alone (1922)
 The Woman Who Was Nothing (1917)
 The Woman in the Window: (1944 & 2021)
 The Woman Wins (1918)
 The Woman With Four Faces (1923)
 A Woman Without Love (1952)
 The Woman Without Nerves (1930)
 The Woman Without a Soul (1920)
 A Woman Is a Woman (1961)
 The Woman Worth Millions (1923)
 Woman of the Year (1942)
 The Woman's Angle (1952)
 The Woman's Crusade (1926)
 A Woman's Decision (1975)
 Woman's Honor (1913)
 Woman's Law (1927)
 The Woman's Law (1916)
 Woman's Love—Woman's Suffering (1937)
 Woman's Place (1921)
 Woman's Temptation (1959)
 A Woman's Vengeance (1948)
 Woman's World: (1954 & 1967)
 Womb (2010)
 Womb Ghosts (2010)
 Wombling Free (1977)
 Women: (1977, 1985 & 1997)
 The Women: (1939 & 2008)
 Women Are Better Diplomats (1941)
 Women Are Like That (1938)
 Women Are No Angels (1943)
 Women Are Trouble (1936)
 Women Are Warriors (1942)
 Women Are Weak (1959)
 Women Aren't Angels (1943)
 Women in Cages (1971)
 Women in Cell Block 7 (1973)
 Women in Cellblock 9 (1977)
 Women in Defense (1941)
 Women and Diamonds (1924)
 Women Don't Want To (1993)
 Women Drive Me Crazy (2013)
 Women Everywhere (1930)
 Women of Faith (2009)
 Women Go on Forever (1931)
 Women of the Gulag (2018)
 Women He's Undressed (2015)
 Women in Love (1969)
 Women Love Once (1931)
 Women & Men: Stories of Seduction (1990)
 Women & Men 2 (1991)
 Women Men Marry (1922)
 Women Must Dress (1935)
 Women in the Night (1948)
 Women Prison (1988)
 Women for Sale (2005)
 Women Side by Side (1949)
 Women Talking (2022)
 Women Talking Dirty (1999)
 Women They Talk About (1928)
 Women in Trouble (2009)
 Women of Valor (1986 TV)
 Women on the Verge of a Nervous Breakdown (1988)
 Women at War (1943)
 Women in War (1940)
 Women of the Weeping River (2016)
 Women Who Commit Adultery (1922)
 Women Who Fall by the Wayside (1925)
 Women Who Flirt (2014)
 Women Who Kill (2016)
 Women Who Play (1932)
 Women Without Tomorrow (1951)
 Women Won't Tell (1932)
 Women of the World (1963)
 Women You Rarely Greet (1925)
 Women's Club: (1936 & 1956)
 Women's Enemy (2013) 
 Women's Games (1946)
 Women's Prison: (1951 & 1955)
 Women's Prison Massacre (1983)
 Women's Property (1999)
 Women's Refuge (1946)
 Women's Sacrifice (1922)
 Women's Town (1953)
 Women's Wares (1927)
 Women's Weapons (1918)

Won

 Won in a Closet (1914)
 Won in the Clouds (1928)
 Won by a Fish (1912)
 Won by a Head (1920)
 Won by Losing (1916)
 Won by a Neck (1930)
 Won on the Post (1912)
 Won Ton Ton, the Dog Who Saved Hollywood (1976)
 Won by Wireless (1911)
 Won't Back Down (2012)
 Won't Last a Day Without You (2011)
 Won't You Be My Neighbor? (2018)
 Wonder (2017)
 Wonder Bar (1934)
 Wonder Boy (2017)
 Wonder Boys (2000)
 Wonder of It All (1974)
 Wonder Man (1945)
 The Wonder Man (1920)
 Wonder Park (2019)
 Wonder Wheel (2017)
Wonder Woman films:
 Wonder Woman: (1974 TV, 2009 animated, & 2017)
Wonder Woman: Bloodlines (2019)
 Wonder Woman 1984 (2020)
 Wonder Women! The Untold Story of American Superheroines (2012)
 Wonder of Women (1929)
 Wonderful Days (2003)
 The Wonderful Horrible Life of Leni Riefenstahl (1993)
 The Wonderful Ice Cream Suit (1998)
 The Wonderful Land of Oz (1969)
 Wonderful Life: (1964 & 2018)
 Wonderful Losers: A Different World (2017)
 Wonderful Mentality (1953)
 Wonderful Nightmare (2015)
 Wonderful Radio (2012)
 The Wonderful Story: (1922 & 1932)
 The Wonderful Story of Henry Sugar (2023)
 Wonderful Things! (1958)
 Wonderful Town (2007)
 The Wonderful Wizard of Oz: (1910 & 1975)
 Wonderful World: (2009 & 2010)
 The Wonderful World of the Brothers Grimm (1962)
 Wonderful World End (2014)
 Wonderful! Liang Xi Mei (2018)
 Wonderland: (1931, 1997, 1999, 2003 & 2013)
 The Wonderland (2019)
 The Wonders (2014)
 The Wonders of Aladdin (1961)
 Wonders of China (1982)
 Wonders of the Sea 3D (2019)
 Wonderstruck (2017)
 Wonderwall (1968)
 Wondrous Boccaccio (2015)
 Wondrous Oblivion (2003)
 Wonka (2023)

Woo

 Woo (1998)
 The Wood (1999)
 Wood Job! (2014)
 Wood Love (1925)
 The Wood Nymph (1916)
 Wood Pigeon (1970)
 Wood & Stock: Sexo, Orégano e Rock'n'Roll (2006)
 Wood for War (1942)
 Woodchipper Massacre (1988)
 Woodcutters of the Deep South (1973)
 The Wooden Box (2006)
 The Wooden Bridge (2012)
 The Wooden Camera (2003)
 Wooden Crosses (1932)
 The Wooden Horse (1950)
 The Wooden Leg (1909)
 The Wooden Man's Bride (1994)
 Wooden Shoes (1917)
 Wooden Staircase (1993)
 Woodenhead (2003)
 Woodland Café (1937)
 Woodlawn (2015)
 Woodpecker (2008)
 Woodpecker from Mars (1956)
 Woodpecker in the Moon (1959)
 Woodpecker in the Rough (1952)
 Woodpeckers (2017)
 Woodpeckers Don't Get Headaches (1974)
 Woodrow Wilson and the Birth of the American Century (2002)
 The Woods: (2006 & 2011)
 The Woods Are Full of Cuckoos (1937)
 Woodshock (2017)
 Woodshop (2010)
 The Woodsman: (2004 & 2016)
 The Woodsman and the Rain (2011)
 Woodstock (1970)
 Woody Dines Out (1945)
 Woody the Giant Killer (1947)
 Woody Meets Davy Crewcut (1956)
 Woody Woodpecker: (1941 short & 2017)
 The Woody Woodpecker Polka (1951)
 Woody's Kook-Out (1961)
 Woof-Woof (1964)
 The Wooing of Eve (1926)
 The Wool Cap (2004)
 Wooly Boys (2001)

Wor

 Word of God (2017)
 Word of Honor: (1981 & 2003)
 Word Is Out: Stories of Some of Our Lives (1977)
 Wordplay (2006)
 The Words (2012)
 Words of Advice: William S. Burroughs on the Road (2007)
 Words on Bathroom Walls (2020)
 Words for Battle (1941)
 Words in Blue (2005)
 Words with Gods (2014)
 Words and Music: (1929 & 1948)
 Words and Pictures (2013)
 Words of Witness (2012)
 Work (1915)
 Work Experience (1989)
 Work Is a Four-Letter Word (1968)
 The Work and the Glory (2004)
 Work It (2020)
 Work at Oil Derricks (1907)
 Work Weather Wife (2014)
 Workers Leaving the Lumière Factory (1895)
 Workhorse (2019)
 Working Class Boy (2018)
 The Working Class Goes to Heaven (1971)
 Working Girl (1988)
 Working Girls: (1931, 1986, 2010 & 2020)
 Working Man (2019)
 Working Tra$h (1990) (TV)
 Working Woman (2018)
 Workingman's Death (2005)
 The World (2004)
 The World According to Garp (1982)
 A World Apart (1988)
 World of the Dead: The Zombie Diaries (2011)
 World of Delight (2015)
 The World Gone Mad (1933)
 The World of Henry Orient (1964)
 The World in His Arms (1952)
 World in My Corner (1956)
 The World Is Not Enough (1999)
 World for Ransom (1954)
 The World of Suzie Wong (1960)
 World and Time Enough (1994)
 World Trade Center (2006)
 World War III (1998)
 World War Z (2013)
 World on a Wire (1973 TV)
 A World Without (2021)
 World Without End (1956)
 World Without Sun (1964)
 A World Without Thieves (2004)
 World's Biggest Gang Bang (1995)
 The World's End (2013)
 The World's Fastest Indian (2005)
 The World's Greatest Athlete (1973)
 World's Greatest Dad (2010)
 The World's Greatest Lover (1978)
 The World's Most Beautiful Swindlers (1964)
 The World's Strongest (1990)
 The World, the Flesh and the Devil: (1914 & 1959)
 The World, the Flesh, the Devil (1932)
 Worlds Apart: (1921, 2008 & 2015)
 Worm: (2006 & 2013)
 The Worst of Faces of Death (1987)
 Worst Friends: (2009 & 2014)
 The Worst Person in the World (2021)
 The Worst Witch (1986) (TV)
 Worth (2020)

Wot-Woz

 Wot a Night (1931)
 Wotakoi: Love Is Hard for Otaku (2020)
 Woubi Chéri (1998)
 Would You Believe It! (1929)
 Would You Have Sex with an Arab? (2011)
 Would You Marry Me? (1967)
 Would You Rather (2012)
 The Wound: (1998 & 2017)
 The Wound of Separation (1959)
 Wounded: (2007 & 2013)
 Wounded in Action (1944)
 The Wounded Angel (2016)
 Wounded Game (1977)
 Wounded Land (2015)
 The Wounded Man (1983)
 Wounds (2019)
 The Wounds (1998)
 Wow (1969)
 Wow, The Kid Gang of Bandits (1991)
 Woyzeck: (1979 & 1994)
 Wozzeck (1947)

Wr

Wra–Wre

 The Wraith (1986)
 The Wraith of Haddon Towers (1916)
 Wrangler: Anatomy of an Icon (2008)
 Wrangler's Roost (1941)
 Wrap Up (2007)
 Wrath (2011)
 The Wrath (2018)
 Wrath of the Dragon (2006)
 The Wrath of God (1972)
 Wrath of Gods (2006)
 The Wrath of the Gods (1914)
 Wrath of Love (1917)
 Wrath of Man (2021)
 Wrath of the Seas (1926)
 The Wrath of Silence (1994)
 Wrath of the Titans (2012)
 The Wrath of Vajra (2013)
 Wrathful Journey (1971)
 A Wreath in Time (1909)
 Wreaths at the Foot of the Mountain (1984)
 The Wreck: (1913 & 1927)
 A Wreck A Tangle (2000)
 The Wreck of the Dunbar or The Yeoman's Wedding (1912)
 The Wreck of the Hesperus: (1927 & 1948)
 Wreck-It Ralph (2012)

 The Wreck of the Mary Deare (1959)
 The Wreck in the North Sea (1915)
 The Wreck of the Singapore (1928)
 Wreckage (1925)
 Wrecked (2011)
 Wrecker (2015)
 The Wrecker: (1929 & 1933)
 Wreckers (2011)
 Wrecking Crew (1942)
 The Wrecking Crew: (1969, 2000 & 2008)
 Wreckless (1935)
 Wrestlemaniac (2006)
 The Wrestler: (1974 & 2008)
 The Wrestler and the Clown (1957)
 Wrestling: (1961 & 2008)
 Wrestling with Angels: Playwright Tony Kushner (2006)
 Wrestling Ernest Hemingway (1993)
 Wrestling Isn't Wrestling (2015)
 Wrestling Swordfish (1931)
 Wrestling Wrecks (1953)
 The Wretched (2019)
 Wretches (2018)
 The Wretches Are Still Singing (1979)
 Wretches & Jabberers (2010)

Wri

 The Wright Brothers (1971)
 The Wright Stuff (1996 TV)
 A Wrinkle in Time: (2003 TV & 2018)
 Wrinkles (2011)
 Wrinkles the Clown (2019)
 Wristcutters: A Love Story (2007)
 Write About Love (2019)
 Write or Dance (2016)
 Write Down, I Am an Arab (2014)
 Write and Fight (1985)
 Write When You Get Work (2018)
 The Writer with No Hands (2017)
 Writer’s Retreat (2015)
 A Writer's Odyssey (2021)
 Writing on the City (2016)
 Writing with Fire (2021)
 The Writing on the Wall (1910)
 Written (2007)
 Written By (2009)
 The Written Law (1931)
 Written in the Stars (1925)
 Written on the Wind (1956)

Wro-Wrz

 Wrong (2013)
 Wrong Again (1929)
 The Wrong Arm of the Law (1963)
 The Wrong Birds (1914)
 The Wrong Bottle (1913)
 The Wrong Box (1966)
 Wrong Connection (1977)
 Wrong Cops (2013)
 The Wrong Couples (1987)
 The Wrong Ferarri (2011)
 The Wrong Girl (1999)
 The Wrong Guy (1997)
 The Wrong Guys (1988)
 The Wrong Husband (1931)
 The Wrong Man: (1917, 1956 & 1993)
 The Wrong Missy (2020)
 The Wrong Mr. Perkins (1931)
 The Wrong Mr. Wright (1927)
 The Wrong Move (1975)
 Wrong No. (2015)
 Wrong No. 2 (2019)
 Wrong Number (2004)
 Wrong Number, Miss (1932)
 Wrong Place (2022)
 Wrong Is Right (1982)
 The Wrong Road (1937)
 Wrong Rosary (2009)
 Wrong Side Raju (2016)
 Wrong Side of the Road (1981)
 Wrong Side of Town (2010)
 Wrong Side Up (2005)
 Wrong Turn series:
 Wrong Turn: (2003 & 2021)
 Wrong Turn 2: Dead End (2007)
 Wrong Turn 3: Left for Dead (2009)
 Wrong Turn 4: Bloody Beginnings (2011)
 Wrong Turn 5: Bloodlines (2012)
 Wrong Turn 6: Last Resort (2014)
 Wrong Turn at Tahoe (2009)
 A Wrong Way to Love (1969)
 Wrong Way Kid (1983)
 The Wrong Woman (1995)
 Wrong World (1985)
 The Wronged Man (2010) (TV)
 Wrongfully Accused (1998)
 Wrzos (1938)

Ws–Wy

 Wsród nocnej ciszy (1978)
 Wu Dang (2012)
 Wu Kong (2017)
 Wubbzy's Big Movie! (2008)
 Wunschkonzert (1940)
 Wuthering Heights: (1920, 1939, 1948 TV, 1953 TV, 1954, 1959 TV, 1970, 1988, 1992, 1998 TV, 2003 TV & 2011)
 Wyatt Earp (1994)
 Wyatt Earp: Return to Tombstone (1994 TV)
 Wyatt Earp's Revenge (2012)
 Wynken, Blynken and Nod (1938)
 Wyoming: (1928, 1940 & 1947)
 The Wyoming Bandit (1949)
 Wyoming Mail (1950)
 Wyoming Outlaw (1939)
 Wyoming Renegades (1954)
 Wyoming Wildcat (1941)
 The Wyoming Wildcat (1925)
 Wyrmwood: Road of the Dead (2014)
 Wyscig pokoju – Warszawa-Berlin-Praga (1952)
 Wyvern (2009 TV)
 The Wyvern Mystery (2000)

Previous:  List of films: T    Next:  List of films: X–Z

See also
 Lists of films
 Lists of actors
 List of film and television directors
 List of documentary films
 List of film production companies

-